This is a list of 1778 species in Simulium, a genus of black flies in the family Simuliidae.

Simulium species

A

 Simulium abadii Takaoka, 2003 c g
 Simulium abatanense Takaoka, 1983 c g
 Simulium abberrans Delfinado, 1969 c g
 Simulium abbreviatum Rubtsov, 1957 c g
 Simulium acarayense Coscaron, Wygodzinsky, 1972 i c g
 Simulium acmeria (Ono, 1978) c g
 Simulium acontum Chen, Zhang & Huang, 2005 c g
 Simulium acostai Takaoka, 1983 c g
 Simulium acrotrichum Rubtsov, 1956 c g
 Simulium acutum (Patrusheva, 1971) c g
 Simulium adamsoni Edwards, 1932 c g
 Simulium adelaideae Craig, 2004 c g
 Simulium adersi Pomeroy, 1922 c g
 Simulium adleri Jitklang & Kuvangkadilok, 2008 c g
 Simulium admixtum Craig, 1987 c g
 Simulium admixum Craig, 1987 g
 Simulium adolfolutzi Wygodzinsky, 1951 c g
 Simulium adornatum (Rubtsov, 1956) c g
 Simulium adsonense Craig, 2006 c g
 Simulium adventicium Datta, 1985 c g
 Simulium aemulum Rubtsov, 1940 c g
 Simulium aeneifacies Edwards, 1933 c g
 Simulium aequifurcatum Lutz, 1910 c g
 Simulium aestivum Davies, Peterson and Wood, 1962 i c g
 Simulium africanum Gibbins, 1934 c g
 Simulium afronuri Lewis & Disney, 1970 c g
 Simulium akopi Chubareva & Kachvoryan, 2000 c g
 Simulium akouense Fain & Elsen, 1973 c g
 Simulium alajense (Rubtsov, 1972) c g
 Simulium alatum Fain & Dujardin, 1983 c g
 Simulium albanense Coscaron, 1991 c g
 Simulium albellum Rubtsov, 1947 c g
 Simulium alberti Takaoka, 2008 c g
 Simulium albicinctum (Enderlein, 1933) i c g
 Simulium albilineatum (Enderlein, 1936) i c g
 Simulium albivirgulatum Wanson & Henrard, 1944 c g
 Simulium albopictum Lane and Porto, 1940 i c g
 Simulium alcocki Pomeroy, 1922 c g
 Simulium alfurense Takaoka, 2003 c g
 Simulium alidae Pilaka & Elouard, 1997 c g
 Simulium alienigenum Takaoka, 1983 c g
 Simulium alirioi Perez and Vulcano, 1973 i c g
 Simulium alizadei Dzhafarov, 1954 c g
 Simulium allaeri Wanson, 1947 c g
 Simulium almae Yankovsky & Koshkimbaev, 1988 c g
 Simulium alpinum (Rubtsov, 1947) c g
 Simulium altayense Cai, 2005 c g
 Simulium amazonicum Goeldi, 1905 i c g
 Simulium ambigens Definado, 1969 c g
 Simulium ambiguum Shiraki, 1935 c g
 Simulium ambonense Takaoka, 2003 c g
 Simulium ambositrae Grenier & Grjebine, 1959 c g
 Simulium ammosovi (Vorobets, 1984) c g
 Simulium amurense (Rubtsov, 1956) c g
 Simulium anaimense Coscaron & Munoz de Hoyos, 1995 c g
 Simulium anamariae Vulcano, 1962 i c g
 Simulium anatinum Wood, 1963 i c g
 Simulium anatolicum Craig, 1987 c g
 Simulium anchistinum Moulton & Adler, 1995 c g
 Simulium anduzei Vargas & Diaz Najera, 1948 c g
 Simulium anggiense Takaoka, 2003 c g
 Simulium angrense Pinto, 1931 i c g
 Simulium angulistylum Takaoka & Davies, 1995 g
 Simulium angustatum (Rubtsov, 1956) c g
 Simulium angusticorne (Rubtsov, 1956) c g
 Simulium angustifilum Rubtsov, 1947 c g
 Simulium angustifrons (Enderlein, 1921) c
 Simulium angustifurca (Rubtsov, 1956) c g
 Simulium angustipes Edwards, 1915 c g
 Simulium angustitarse (Lundstrom, 1911) c g
 Simulium annae (Rubtsov, 1956) c g
 Simulium annulatum Philippi, 1865 c g
 Simulium annuliforme (Rubtsov, 1962) c g
 Simulium annulitarse (Zetterstedt, 1838) c g
 Simulium annulum (Lundstrom, 1911) c g
 Simulium annulus (Lundstrom, 1911) b  (loon blackfly)
 Simulium antenusi (Lane & Porto, 1940) c g
 Simulium antibrachium Fain & Dujardin, 1983 c g
 Simulium antillarum Jennings, 1915 i c g
 Simulium antlerum Chen, 2001 c g
 Simulium antonii Wygodzinsky, 1953 i c g
 Simulium antunesi Lane and Porto, 1940 i g
 Simulium aokii (Takahasi, 1941) c g
 Simulium apoense Takaoka, 1983 c g
 Simulium appalachiense Adler, Currie & Wood, 2004 c g
 Simulium apricarium Adler, Currie & Wood, 2004 c g
 Simulium arabicum Crosskey, 1982 c g
 Simulium arakawae Matsumura, 1921 c g
 Simulium aranti Stone and Snoddy, 1969 i c g
 Simulium arboreum Takaoka, 2006 c g
 Simulium arcabucense Coscaron, 1991 c g
 Simulium arcticum Malloch, 1914 i c g
 Simulium arctium (Rubtsov, 1956) c g
 Simulium arenicola Liu,  Gong, Zhang, Luo &  An, 2003 c g
 Simulium arfakense Takaoka, 2003 c g
 Simulium argentatum Enderlein, 1936 i c g
 Simulium argenteostriatum Strobl, 1898 c g
 Simulium argentipes Edwards, 1928 c g
 Simulium argentipile (Rubtsov, 1962) c g
 Simulium argentiscutum Shelley & Luna Dias, 1980 c g
 Simulium argus Williston, 1893 i c g
 Simulium argyreatum (Meigen, 1838) c g
 Simulium argyrocinctum Meijere, 1913 c g
 Simulium arisanum Shiraki, 1935 c g
 Simulium arlecchinum Craig, 1987 c g
 Simulium armeniacum (Rubtsov, 1955) c g
 Simulium armoricanum Doby & David, 1961 c g
 Simulium arnoldi Gibbins, 1937 c g
 Simulium aropaense Takaoka, 1995 c g
 Simulium arpiense (Terteryan & Kachvoryan, 1982) c g
 Simulium arpiensis Terteryan & Kachvoryan, 1982 c g
 Simulium artum Sato, Takaoka & Saito, 2005 c g
 Simulium asakoae Takaoka & Davies, 1995 g
 Simulium asishi Datta, 1988 c g
 Simulium aspericorne Fain & Bafort, 1976 c g
 Simulium asperum Takaoka, 2003 c g
 Simulium assadovi (Dzhafarov, 1956) c g
 Simulium asulcatum (Rubtsov, 1956) c g
 Simulium atipornae Takaoka, Srisuka & Choochote, 2014 g
 Simulium atlanticum Crosskey, 1969 c g
 Simulium atlasicum Giudicelli & Bouzidi, 1989 c g
 Simulium atratoides Takaoka & Davies, 1996 c g
 Simulium atratum Meijere, 1913 c g
 Simulium atrum Delfinado, 1969 c g
 Simulium atyophilum Lewis & Disney, 1969 c g
 Simulium audreyae Garms & Disney, 1974 c g
 Simulium aureliani Fain, 1950 c g
 Simulium aureofulgens Terteryan, 1949 c g
 Simulium aureohirtum Brunetti, 1911 c g
 Simulium aureonigrum Mackerras & Mackerras, 1950 c g
 Simulium aureosimile Pomeroy, 1920 c g
 Simulium aureum Fries, 1824 i c g
 Simulium auricoma (Meigen, 1818) c g
 Simulium auripellitum Enderlein, 1933 i c g
 Simulium auristriatum Lutz, 1910 i c g
 Simulium australe (Rubtsov, 1955) c g
 Simulium avilae Smart & Clifford, 1965 c g
 Simulium awashense Uemoto, Ogata & Mebrahtu, 1977 c g
 Simulium ayrozai Vargas, 1945 c g
 Simulium azerbaidzhanicum (Dzhafarov, 1953) c g
 Simulium azorense (Carlsson, 1963) c g

B

 Simulium baatori (Rubtsov, 1967) c g
 Simulium babai Takaoka & Aoki, 2007 c g
 Simulium babuyanense Takaoka & Tenedero, 2007 c g
 Simulium bachmaense Takaoka & Sofian-Azirun g
 Simulium bachmanni Wygodzinsky & Coscaron, 1967 c g
 Simulium baetiphilum Lewis & Disney, 1972 c g
 Simulium baffinense Twinn, 1936 i c g
 Simulium baforti Fain & Dujardin, 1983 c g
 Simulium bagmaticum Markey, 1985 c g
 Simulium bahense Chen, 2003 c g
 Simulium baiense Pinto, 1931 i g
 Simulium baiensis Pinto, 1932 c g
 Simulium baimaii Takaoka & Kuvangkadilok, 1999 c g
 Simulium baisasae Delfinado, 1962 c g
 Simulium balcanicum (Enderlein, 1924) c g
 Simulium baliemense Takaoka, 2003 c g
 Simulium baltazarae Delfinado, 1962 c g
 Simulium balteatum Adler, Currie & Wood, 2004 c g
 Simulium banahauense Takaoka, 2006 c g
 Simulium banaticum Dinulescu, 1966 c g
 Simulium banauense Takaoka, 1983 c g
 Simulium banksi Craig, 2006 c g
 Simulium banluangense Takaoka, Srisuka & Fukuda, 2020 g
 Simulium bannaense Chen & Zhang, 2003 c g
 Simulium bansonae Takaoka, 1983 c g
 Simulium barabense (Rubtsov, 1973) c g
 Simulium baracorne Smart, 1944 c g
 Simulium barbatipes Enderlein, 1933 i c g
 Simulium barnesi Takaoka & Suzuki, 1984 c g
 Simulium barraudi Puri, 1932 c g
 Simulium barretti Smart & Clifford, 1965 c g
 Simulium bartangum Chubareva, 2000 c g
 Simulium bataksense Takaoka & Tenedero, 2007 c g
 Simulium batoense Edwards, 1934 c g
 Simulium bayakorum Fain & Elsen, 1974 c g
 Simulium beaupertuyi Perez, Rassi, Ramirez, 1977 i c g
 Simulium beiwanense Guo, Zhang, An, Zhang, Zhang, Dong, & Zhao, 2008 c g
 Simulium beltukovae (Rubtsov, 1956) c g
 Simulium benjamini Dalamt, 1952 c g
 Simulium benquetense Takaoka, 1983 c g
 Simulium bequaerti Gibbins, 1936 c g
 Simulium berberum Giudicelli & Bouzidi, 1989 c g
 Simulium berchtesgadense  g
 Simulium berghei Fain, 1949 c g
 Simulium bergi Rubtsov, 1956 c g
 Simulium beringovi Bodrova, 1988 c g
 Simulium berneri Freeman, 1954 c g
 Simulium bertrandi Grenier & Dorier, 1959 c g
 Simulium bezzii Corti, 1914 c g
 Simulium biakense Takaoka, 2003 c g
 Simulium biancoi (Rubtsov, 1964) c g
 Simulium bicolense Takaoka, 1983 c g
 Simulium bicoloratum Malloch, 1913 i g
 Simulium bicorne Dorog., Rubtsov, and Vlasenko, 1935 i c g
 Simulium bicornutum Wygodzinsky & Coscaron, 1982 c g
 Simulium bidentatum (Shiraki, 1935) c g
 Simulium bifenestratum Hamada & Pepinelli, 2004 c g
 Simulium bifila Freeman & Meillon, 1953 c g
 Simulium biforaminiferum Datta, 1974 c g
 Simulium bifurcatum Takaoka, 2003 c g
 Simulium bimaculatum (Rubtsov, 1956) c g
 Simulium binuanense Takaoka, 2008 c g
 Simulium bipunctatum Malloch, 1912 c g
 Simulium biseriatum Rubtsov, 1940 c g
 Simulium bisnovem Gibbins, 1938 c g
 Simulium biuxinisa Coscaron & Ibanez Bernal, 1994 c g
 Simulium bivittatum Malloch, 1914 i c g
 Simulium blacklocki Meillon, 1930 c g
 Simulium blancasi Wygodzinsky, Coscaron, 1070 i c g
 Simulium blantoni Field, 1967 c g
 Simulium bobpetersoni Coscaron, Ibanez-Bernal & Coscaron-Arias, 1996 c g
 Simulium bogusium Craig, 1997 c g
 Simulium boldstemta (Ono, 1978) c g
 Simulium bonaerense Coscaron & Wygodzinsky, 1984 c g
 Simulium bonninense (Shiraki, 1935) c g
 Simulium bordai Coscaron, Wygodzinsky, 1910 i c g
 Simulium borneoense Takaoka, 2001 c g
 Simulium borunicornutum Pilaka & Elouard, 1999 c g
 Simulium botulibranchium Lutz, 1910 i c g
 Simulium botulus Smart & Clifford, 1965 c g
 Simulium bovis Meillon, 1930 c g
 Simulium brachium Gibbins, 1936 c g
 Simulium brachyantherum Rubtsov, 1947 c g
 Simulium brachyarthrum (Rubtsov, 1956) c g
 Simulium brachycladum Lutz, Pinto, 1931 i c g
 Simulium brachystylum (Rubtsov, 1976) c g
 Simulium bracteatum Coquillett, 1898 i c g
 Simulium brandti Smart & Clifford, 1965 c g
 Simulium bravermani Beaucournu-Saguez, 1986 c g
 Simulium brevicorne (Rubtsov, 1964) c g
 Simulium brevidens (Rubtsov, 1956) c g
 Simulium brevifile (Rubtsov, 1956) c g
 Simulium breviflagellum Takaoka & Sofian-Azirun, 2015 g
 Simulium brevifurcatum Lutz, 1910 i c g
 Simulium brevilabrum Takaoka, 2006 c g
 Simulium brevitarse (Rubtsov, 1976) c g
 Simulium brevitruncatum Takaoka, 2003 c g
 Simulium bricenoi Vargas, Palacios & Najera, 1946 c g
 Simulium brinchangense Takaoka, Sofian-Azirun & Hashim g
 Simulium bronchiale (Rubtsov, 1962) c g
 Simulium brunhesi Elouard & Ranaivoharindriaka, 1996 c g
 Simulium brunneum (Yankovsky, 1977) c g
 Simulium bryopodium Delfinado, 1971 c g
 Simulium buckleyi Meillon, 1944 c g
 Simulium bucolicum Datta, 1975 c g
 Simulium buettikeri Crosskey & Roberts, 1994 c g
 Simulium buisseti Fain & Elsen, 1980 c g
 Simulium buissoni Roubaud, 1906 c g
 Simulium bujakovi Rubtsov, 1940 c g
 Simulium bukovskii Rubtsov, 1940 c g
 Simulium bulbiferum Fain & Dujardin, 1983 c g
 Simulium bulbosum Lewis, 1973 c g
 Simulium bulla Davies & Gyorkos, 1987 c g
 Simulium bullatum Takaoka & Choochote, 2005 c g
 Simulium burchi Dalmat, 1951 c g
 Simulium burgeri Adler, Currie & Wood, 2004 c g
 Simulium burmense Takaoka, 1989 c g
 Simulium bustosi Vargas & Palacios, 1946 c g
 Simulium buxtoni Austen, 1923 c g
 Simulium bwambanum  g

C

 Simulium cabrerai Takaoka, 1983 c g
 Simulium caesariatum Craig & Joy, 2000 c g
 Simulium cagayanense Takaoka, 2005 c g
 Simulium caledonense Adler and Currie, 1986 i c g
 Simulium callidum Dyar and Shannon, 1927 i c g
 Simulium callipygium Craig, 2006 c g
 Simulium canadense Hearle, 1932 i c g
 Simulium candelabrum Fain & Dujardin, 1983 c g
 Simulium canescens Breme, 1842 c g
 Simulium cangshanense Xue, 1993 c g
 Simulium canlaonense Delfinado, 1969 c g
 Simulium canonicola (Dyar and Shannon, 1927) i c g
 Simulium caohaiense Chen & Zhang, 1997 c g
 Simulium capricorne Leon, 1945 c g
 Simulium caprii Wygodzinsky & Coscaron, 1967 c g
 Simulium carbunculum Adler, Currie & Wood, 2004 c g
 Simulium carinatum Delfinado, 1969 c g
 Simulium carolinae Leon, 1945 c g
 Simulium carpathicum (Knoz, 1961) c g
 Simulium carthusiense Grenier & Dorier, 1959 c g
 Simulium castaneum Craig, 1987 c g
 Simulium cataractarum Craig, 1987 c g
 Simulium catariense Pinto, 1932 c g
 Simulium catarinense Pinto, 1931 i g
 Simulium catleyi Smart & Clifford, 1965 c g
 Simulium caucasicum Rubtsov, 1940 c g
 Simulium cauchense Floch, Abonnenc, 1946 i c g
 Simulium cauveryense Anbalagan g
 Simulium cavum Gibbins, 1938 c g
 Simulium celebesense Takaoka, 2003 c g
 Simulium celsum Takaoka & Davies, 1996 c g
 Simulium centrale Smart & Clifford, 1965 c g
 Simulium cerqueira Almeida, 1974 i g
 Simulium cerqueirai Barbosa de Almeida, 1979 c g
 Simulium cerradense Coscaron, de Cerqueira, Schumaker & La Salvia, 1992 c g
 Simulium cervicornutum Pomeroy, 1920 c g
 Simulium cervus Smart & Clifford, 1965 c g
 Simulium ceylonicum (Enderlein, 1921) c g
 Simulium chainarongi Takaoka & Kuvangkadilok, 1999 c g
 Simulium chairuddini Takaoka, 2003 c g
 Simulium chalcocoma Knab, 1914 i
 Simulium chaliowae Takaoka & Kuvangkadilok, 1999 c g
 Simulium chamlongi Takaoka & Suzuki, 1984 c g
 Simulium chaowaense Takaoka, Srisuka & Saeung, 2020 g
 Simulium chaquense Coscaron, 1971 c g
 Simulium chaudinhense Takaoka & Sofian-Azirun g
 Simulium cheedhangi Takaoka & Sofian-Azirun g
 Simulium cheesmanae Edwards, 1927 c g
 Simulium chelevini (Ivashchenko, 1968) c g
 Simulium cheni Xue, 1993 c g
 Simulium chenzhouense Chen, Zhang & Bi, 2004 c g
 Simulium chiangmaiense Takaoka & Suzuki, 1984 c g
 Simulium chiharuae Takaoka, Otsuka & Fukuda, 2007 c g
 Simulium chilianum Rondani, 1863 c g
 Simulium chimguazaense  g
 Simulium chiriquiense Field, 1967 c g
 Simulium chitoense Takaoka, 1979 c g
 Simulium chlorum Moulton & Adler, 1995 c g
 Simulium cholodkovskii Rubtsov, 1940 c g
 Simulium chomustachi (Vorobets, 1977) c g
 Simulium chongqingense Zhu & Wang, 1995 c g
 Simulium chongqingensis Zhu & Wang, 1995 c g
 Simulium choochotei Takaoka & Choochote, 2002 c g
 Simulium chovdica (Yankovsky, 1996) c g
 Simulium chowettani Yankovsky, 1996 c g
 Simulium chowi Takaoka, 1979 c g
 Simulium christophersi Puri, 1932 c g
 Simulium chromatinum Adler, Currie & Wood, 2004 c g
 Simulium chromocentrum Adler, Currie & Wood, 2004 c g
 Simulium chubarevae (Kachvoryan & Terteryan, 1981) c g
 Simulium chungi Takaoka & Huang, 2006 c g
 Simulium chutteri Lewis, 1965 c g
 Simulium claricentrum Adler, 1990 c g
 Simulium clarkei Stone and Snoddy, 1969 i c g
 Simulium clarki Fairchild, 1940 i c g
 Simulium clarum (Dyar & Shannon, 1927) c g
 Simulium clathrinum Mackerras & Mackerras, 1948 c g
 Simulium clavibranchium Lutz, 1910 i c g
 Simulium clavum Smart & Clifford, 1965 c g
 Simulium clibanarium Craig, 1997 c g
 Simulium coalitum Pomeroy, 1922 c g
 Simulium coarctatum Rubtsov, 1940 c g
 Simulium codreanui (Sherban, 1958) c g
 Simulium colasbelcouri Grenier & Ovazza, 1951 c g
 Simulium colombaschense (Scopoli, 1780) c g
 Simulium concavustylum Deng, Zhang & Chen, 1995 c g
 Simulium concludium Craig, 1997 c g
 Simulium confertum Takaoka & Sofian-Azirun, 2015 g
 Simulium confusum Moulton & Adler, 1995 c g
 Simulium congareenarum (Dyar and Shannon, 1927) i c g
 Simulium congi Takaoka & Sofian-Azirun, 2015 g
 Simulium congonse Gouteux, 1977 c g
 Simulium conicum Adler, Currie & Wood, 2004 c g
 Simulium connae Craig, 1997 c g
 Simulium consimile Puri, 1932 c g
 Simulium continii (Rivosecchi & Cardinali, 1975) c g
 Simulium contractum Takaoka, 2003 c g
 Simulium contrerense Najera & Vulcano, 1962 c g
 Simulium conundrum Adler, Currie & Wood, 2004 c g
 Simulium conviti Perez and Vulcano, 1973 i
 Simulium copleyi Gibbins, 1941 c g
 Simulium corbis Twinn, 1936 i c g
 Simulium cormonsi Wygodzinsky, 1971 i c g
 Simulium corniferum (Yankovsky, 1979) c g
 Simulium corpulentum Rubtsov, 1956 c g
 Simulium coscaroni Nascimento, Hamada & Adler, 2017 g
 Simulium costalimai Vargas & Palacios, 1946 c g
 Simulium costaricense Smart, 1944 i c g
 Simulium costatum Friederichs, 1920 c g
 Simulium cotabatoense Takaoka, 1983 c g
 Simulium cotopaxi Wygodzinsky and Coscaron, 1979 i c g
 Simulium courtneyi Takaoka & Adler, 1997 c g
 Simulium couverti (Rubtsov, 1964) c g
 Simulium covagarciai Perez, Yarzabal & Tada, 1984 c g
 Simulium craigi Adler and Currie, 1986 i c g
 Simulium crassicaulum (Rubtsov, 1955) c g
 Simulium crassifilum Rubtsov, 1947 c g
 Simulium crassimanum Edwards, 1933 c g
 Simulium crassum (Rubtsov, 1956) c g
 Simulium cremnosi Davies & Gyorkos, 1987 c g
 Simulium crenobium (Knoz, 1961) c g
 Simulium criniferum Nascimento, Hamada, Andrade-Souza & Adler, 2017 g
 Simulium cristalinum Coscaron & Py-Daniel, 1989 c g
 Simulium cristatum Smart & Clifford, 1965 c g
 Simulium croaticum (Baranov, 1937) c g
 Simulium crocinum Takaoka & Choochote, 2005 c g
 Simulium crosskeyi Lewis & Disney, 1970 c g
 Simulium croxtoni Nicholson and Mickel, 1950 i c g
 Simulium cruszi Davies & Gyorkos, 1992 c g
 Simulium cryophilum (Rubtsov, 1959) c g
 Simulium cuasiexiguum Shelley, Luna Dias, Maia-Herzog, Lowry, Garritano, Penn &  Camargo, 2001 c g
 Simulium cuasisanguineum Perez & Yarzabal, 1982 c g
 Simulium cuneatum (Enderlein, 1936) i c g
 Simulium curriei Adler & Wood, 1991 c g
 Simulium curtatum  g
 Simulium curvans (Rubtsov & Carlsson, 1965) c g
 Simulium curvastylum Chen & Zhang, 2001 c g
 Simulium curvistylus Rubtsov, 1957 c g
 Simulium curvitarse Rubtsov, 1940 c g
 Simulium curvum Takaoka, 2003 c g

D

 Simulium dachaisense Takaoka & Lau, 2015 g
 Simulium dahestanicum (Rubtsov, 1962) c g
 Simulium daisense (Takahasi, 1950) c g
 Simulium dalmati Vargas & Najera, 1948 c g
 Simulium daltanhani Hamada & Adler, 1998 c g
 Simulium damascenoi Py-Daniel, 1988 c g
 Simulium damingense Chen, Zhang & Zhang, 2007 c g
 Simulium damnosum Theobald, 1903 c g
 Simulium dandrettai Vargas, Palacios & Najera, 1946 c g
 Simulium danense Gouteux, 1979 c g
 Simulium danijari Chubareva & Ismagulov, 1992 c g
 Simulium darjeelingense Datta, 1973 c g
 Simulium dasguptai Datta, 1974 c g
 Simulium davaoense Takaoka, 1983 c g
 Simulium dawaense Uemoto, Ogata & Mebrahtu, 1977 c g
 Simulium deagostinii Coscaron & Wygodzinsky, 1962 c g
 Simulium debacli (Terteryan, 1952) c g
 Simulium debegene Meillon, 1934 c g
 Simulium decafile (Rubtsov, 1976) c g
 Simulium decafiliatum (Yankovsky, 1996) c g
 Simulium decimatum Dorogostaisky & Vlasenko, 1935 c g
 Simulium decimfiliatum (Rubtsov, 1956) c g
 Simulium decollectum Adler and Currie, 1986 i c g
 Simulium decolletum Adler & Currie, 1986 c g
 Simulium decorum Walker, 1848 i c g
 Simulium decuplum Takaoka & Davies, 1995 g
 Simulium definitum Moulton & Adler, 1995 c g
 Simulium defoliarti Stone and Peterson, 1958 i c g
 Simulium degrangei Dorier & Grenier, 1960 c g
 Simulium dehnei Field, 1969 c g
 Simulium dekeyseri Shelley & Py-Daniel, 1981 c g
 Simulium delatorrei Dalmat, 1950 c g
 Simulium delfinadoae Takaoka, 1983 c g
 Simulium delizhanense (Rubtsov, 1955) c g
 Simulium delponteianum Wygoszinsky, 1961 c g
 Simulium demutaense Takaoka, 2003 c g
 Simulium dendrofilum (Patrusheva, 1962) c g
 Simulium dentatum Puri, 1932 c g
 Simulium dentatura (Vorobets, 1984) c g
 Simulium dentistylum Takaoka & Davies, 1995 g
 Simulium dentulosum Roubaud, 1915 c g
 Simulium deserticola Rubtsov, 1940 c g
 Simulium desertorum Rubtsov, 1938 c g
 Simulium desirei Pilaka & Elouard, 1999 c g
 Simulium diamantinum Coscaron & Coscaron-Arias, 1996 c g
 Simulium diaznajerai Vargas, 1943 c g
 Simulium diceros Freeman & Meillon, 1953 c g
 Simulium dieguerense Vajime & Dunbar, 1975 c g
 Simulium digitatum Puri, 1932 c g
 Simulium digrammicum Edwards, 1928 c g
 Simulium dinakarani Anbalagan, Vijayan, Balachandran, Thiyonila & Surya, 2020 g
 Simulium dinellii Joan, 1912 i c g
 Simulium discrepans Delfinado, 1969 c g
 Simulium disneyi Takaoka & Roberts, 1988 c g
 Simulium distinctum Lutz, 1910 c g
 Simulium diversibranchium Lutz, 1910 i c g
 Simulium diversifurcatum Lutz, 1910 i
 Simulium dixiense Stone and Snoddy, 1969 i c g
 Simulium djafarovi (Rubtsov, 1962) c g
 Simulium djallonense Roubaud & Grenier, 1943 c g
 Simulium djebaglense (Rubtsov, 1956) c g
 Simulium dogieli (Rubtsov, 1956) c g
 Simulium doipuiense Takaoka & Choochote, 2005 c g
 Simulium doisaketense  g
 Simulium dojeycorium Craig, 1997 c g
 Simulium dola Davies & Gyorkos, 1987 c g
 Simulium dolini Usova & Sukhomlin, 1989 c g
 Simulium dolomitense (Rivosecchi, 1971) c g
 Simulium donovani Vargas, 1943 c g
 Simulium downsi Vargas, Palacio, Nayera, 1946 i c g
 Simulium dubitskii (Yankovsky, 1996) c g
 Simulium duboisi Fain, 1950 c g
 Simulium dudgeoni Takaoka & Davies, 1995 c g
 Simulium dugesi Vargas, Palacios & Najera, 1946 c g
 Simulium dukei Lewis, Disney & Crosskey, 1969 c g
 Simulium dumogaense Takaoka & Roberts, 1988 c g
 Simulium dunfellense (Davies, 1966) c g
 Simulium dunhuangense Liu & An, 2004 c g
 Simulium duodecimcornutum (Rubtsov, 1956) c g
 Simulium duodecimum Gibbins, 1936 c g
 Simulium duodenicornium Pipinelli, Hamada & Trivinho-Strixino, 2005 c g
 Simulium duolongum Takaoka & Davies, 1995 g
 Simulium duplex Shewell and Fredeen, 1958 i c g
 Simulium dureti Wygodzinsky, Coscaron, 1967 i c g
 Simulium dussertorum Craig, 1997 c g
 Simulium dycei Colbo, 1976 c g

E

 Simulium earlei Vargas & Najera, 1946 c g
 Simulium ecuadoriense Enderlein, 1934 i g
 Simulium edwardsi (Enderlein, 1934) c g
 Simulium egregium Seguy, 1930 c g
 Simulium ekomei Lewis & Disney, 1972 c g
 Simulium ela Davies & Gyorkos, 1987 c g
 Simulium elatum (Rubtsov, 1955) c g
 Simulium elburnum (Rubtsov & Carlsson, 1965) c g
 Simulium elongatum Takaoka, 2003 c g
 Simulium emarginatum Davies, Peterson and Wood, 1962 i c g
 Simulium emiliae (Rubtsov, 1976) c g
 Simulium empascae Py-Daniel & Moreira, 1988 c g
 Simulium empopomae Meillon, 1937 c g
 Simulium encisoi Vargas and Diaz Najera, 1949 i c g
 Simulium englundi Craig, 2004 c g
 Simulium eouzani Germain & Grenier, 1970 c g
 Simulium ephemerophilum Rubtsov, 1947 c g
 Simulium ephippioidum Chen & Wen, 1999 c g
 Simulium epistum Delfinado, 1971 c g
 Simulium equinum (Linnaeus, 1758) c g
 Simulium erectum (Rubtsov, 1959) c g
 Simulium erimoense (Ono, 1980) c g
 Simulium erythrocephalum (De Geer, 1776) c g
 Simulium escomeli Roubaud, 1909 i c g
 Simulium estevezi Vargas, 1945 c g
 Simulium ethelae Dalmat, 1950 i c g
 Simulium ethiopiense Fain & Oomen, 1968 c g
 Simulium euryadminiculum Davies, 1949 i c g
 Simulium euryplatamus Sun & Song, 1995 c g
 Simulium evelynae Smart & Clifford, 1965 c g
 Simulium evenhuisi Craig, 1997 c g
 Simulium evillense Fain, Hallot & Bafort, 1966 c g
 Simulium exasperans Craig, 1987 c g
 Simulium excisum Davies, Peterson and Wood, 1962 i c g
 Simulium exiguum Roubaud, 1906 i c g
 Simulium exile (Rubtsov, 1956) c g
 Simulium eximium Meijere, 1913 c g
 Simulium exulatum Adler, Currie & Wood, 2004 c g

F

 Simulium faheyi Taylor, 1927 c g
 Simulium falcoe (Shiraki, 1935) c g
 Simulium falculatum (Enderlein, 1929) c g
 Simulium fallisi (Golini, 1975) c g
 Simulium fangense Takaoka, 2006 c g
 Simulium fanjingshanense Chen, Zhang & Wen, 2000 c g
 Simulium fararae Craig & Joy, 2000 c g
 Simulium farciminis Smart & Clifford, 1965 c g
 Simulium fenestratum Edwards, 1934 c g
 Simulium ferganicum Rubtsov, 1940 c g
 Simulium feuerborni Edwards, 1934 c g
 Simulium fibrinflatum Twinn, 1936 i c g b  (inflated gnat)
 Simulium fidum Datta, 1975 c g
 Simulium fimbriatum Smart & Clifford, 1965 c g
 Simulium fionae Adler, 1990 c g
 Simulium flaveolum Rubtsov, 1940 c g
 Simulium flavicans Rubtsov, 1956 c g
 Simulium flavidum Rubtsov, 1947 c g
 Simulium flavifemur Enderlein, 1921 i g
 Simulium flavigaster Rubtsov, 1969 c g
 Simulium flavinotatum Fain & Dujardin, 1983 c g
 Simulium flavipes Austen, 1921 c g
 Simulium flavipictum Knab, 1914 i c g
 Simulium flavoantennatum Rubtsov, 1940 c g
 Simulium flavocinctum Edwards, 1934 c g
 Simulium flavopubescens Lutz, 1910 i
 Simulium flavum Takaoka, 2003 c g
 Simulium flexibranchium Crosskey, 2001 c g
 Simulium florae (Dzhafarov, 1954) c g
 Simulium floresense Takaoka, 2006 c g
 Simulium fluviatile Radzivilovskaya, 1948 c g
 Simulium fontanum Terteryan, 1952 c g
 Simulium fontinale Radzivilovskaya, 1948 c g
 Simulium fontium (Rubtsov, 1955) c g
 Simulium forcipatum Delfinado, 1969 c g
 Simulium fossatiae Craig, 1997 c g
 Simulium fragai Abreu, 1960 c g
 Simulium freemani Vargas & Najera, 1949 c g
 Simulium friederichsi Edwards, 1934 c g
 Simulium friedlanderi Py-Daniel, 1987 c g
 Simulium frigidum Rubtsov, 1940 c g
 Simulium fucense (Rivosecchi, 1962) c g
 Simulium fujianense Zhang-tao & Wang, 1991 c g
 Simulium fuliginis Field, 1969 c g
 Simulium fulvibnotum Cerqueira and Mello, 1968 i g
 Simulium fulvipes (Ono, 1978) c g
 Simulium furcillatum Wygodzinsky & Coscaron, 1982 c g
 Simulium furculatum (Shewell, 1952) i c g
 Simulium fuscatum Yankovsky, 1996 c g
 Simulium fuscicorne Fain, 1950 c g
 Simulium fuscidorsum Takaoka g
 Simulium fuscinervis Edwards, 1933 c g
 Simulium fuscitarse Takaoka, 2003 c g
 Simulium fuscopilosum Edwards, 1928 c g
 Simulium fuscum (Rubtsov, 1963) c g
 Simulium futaense Garms & Post, 1966 c g
 Simulium fuzhouense Zhang & Wang, 1991 c g

G

 Simulium gabaldoni Perez, 1971 i c g
 Simulium gabovae (Rubtsov, 1966) c g
 Simulium gagiduense Smart & Clifford, 1965 c g
 Simulium gallinum Edwards, 1932 c g
 Simulium galloprovinciale Giuducelli, 1963 c g
 Simulium ganalesense Vargas & Palacios, 1946 c g
 Simulium gariepsense Meillon, 1953 c g
 Simulium garmsi Crosskey, 1969 c g
 Simulium garniense (Rubtsov, 1955) c g
 Simulium gatchaliani Takaoka, 1983 c g
 Simulium gaudeatum Knab, 1914 i g
 Simulium gaurani Coscaron and Wygodzinsky, 1972 i g
 Simulium geigyi Garms & Hausermann, 1968 c g
 Simulium gejgelense (Dzhafarov, 1954) c g
 Simulium germuense Liu,  Gong, Zhang, Luo &  An, 2003 c g
 Simulium ghoomense Datta, 1975 c g
 Simulium gibense Uemoto, Ogata & Mebrahtu, 1977 c g
 Simulium giganteum Rubtzov, 1940 i c g
 Simulium gilleti Fain & Hallot, 1964 c g
 Simulium gimpuense Takaoka, 2003 c g
 Simulium glatthaari Takaoka & Davies, 1995 c g
 Simulium globosum Takaoka, 2003 c g
 Simulium goeldi Cerqueira and Mello, 1967 i
 Simulium goeldii Cerqueira & Mello, 1967 c g
 Simulium goinyi Lewis & Hanney, 1965 c g
 Simulium golani (Beaucornu-Saguez, 1977) c g
 Simulium gombakense Takaoka & Davies, 1995 g
 Simulium gomphocorne (Rubtsov, 1964) c g
 Simulium gonzalezherrejoni Diaz Najera, 1969 c g
 Simulium gonzalezi Vargas & Díaz Nájera, 1953 c g
 Simulium gorokae Smart & Clifford, 1965 c g
 Simulium gouldingi Stone, 1952 i c g
 Simulium gracile Datta, 1973 c g
 Simulium gracilipes Edwards, 1921 c g
 Simulium gravelyi Puri, 1933 c g
 Simulium grenieri Pilaka & Elouard, 1999 c g
 Simulium grerreroi Perez, 1071 i g
 Simulium gribae Rubtsov, 1956 c g
 Simulium griseicolle Becker, 1903 c g
 Simulium griseifrons Brunetti, 1911 c g
 Simulium grisescens Brunetti, 1911 c g
 Simulium griseum Coquillett, 1898 i c g
 Simulium griveaudi Ovazzar & Ovazza, 1970 c g
 Simulium grossifilum Takaoka & Davies, 1995 g
 Simulium guamense Stone, 1964 c g
 Simulium guaporense Py-Daniel, 1989 c g
 Simulium guerrerense Vargas & Najera, 1956 c g
 Simulium guerreroi Ramirez-Perez, 1971 c g
 Simulium guianense Wise, 1911 i c g
 Simulium guimari Becker, 1908 c g
 Simulium guniki Takaoka, 2001 c g
 Simulium gurneyae Senior-White, 1922 c g
 Simulium gusevi Rubtsov, 1976 c g
 Simulium gutsevitshi (Yankovsky, 1978) c g
 Simulium guttatum (Enderlein, 1936) i c g
 Simulium gviletense (Rubtsov, 1956) c g
 Simulium gyas Meillon, 1951 c g
 Simulium gyorkosae Takaoka & Davies, 1996 c g

H

 Simulium hackeri Edwards, 1929 c g
 Simulium hadiae Takaoka, 2003 c g
 Simulium haematopotum Malloch, 1914 i c g
 Simulium haematoptum Malloch i g
 Simulium hagai Takaoka, 2003 c g
 Simulium haiduanens Takaoka, Low & Huang, 2018 g
 Simulium hailuogouense Chen, Huang & Zhang, 2005 c g
 Simulium halmaheraense Takaoka, 2003 c g
 Simulium hargreavesi Gibbins, 1934 c g
 Simulium harrisoni Freeman & Meillon, 1953 c g
 Simulium haysi Stone and Snoddy, 1969 i c g
 Simulium hechti Vargas, Martinez Palacios & Diaz Najera, 1946 c g
 Simulium hectorvargasi Coscaron & Wygodzinsky, 1972 c g
 Simulium heishuiense Wen & Chen, 2006 c g
 Simulium heldsbachense Smart & Clifford, 1965 c g
 Simulium hematophilum Laboulbene, 1882 c g
 Simulium hemicyclium Smart & Clifford, 1965 c g
 Simulium henanense Wen & Chen, 2007 c g
 Simulium hengshanense Bi & Chen, 2004 c g
 Simulium heptapotamicum (Rubtsov, 1940) c g
 Simulium heptaspicae Gouteux, 1977 c g
 Simulium herreri Wygodzinsky and Coscaron, 1967 i c g
 Simulium hessei Gibbins, 1941 c g
 Simulium hibernale (Rubtsov, 1967) c g
 Simulium hiemale Rubtsov, 1956 c g
 Simulium hieroglyphicum Peterson, Vargas & Ramirez-Perez, 1988 c g
 Simulium hightoni Lewis, 1961 c g
 Simulium himalayense Puri, 1932 c g
 Simulium hinmani Vargas & Najera, 1946 c g
 Simulium hiroshii Takaoka, 1994 c g
 Simulium hiroyukii  g
 Simulium hirsutilateris Meillon, 1937 c g
 Simulium hirsutum Pomeroy, 1922 c g
 Simulium hirticranioum Craig & Joy, 2000 g
 Simulium hirticranium Craig & Joy, 2000 c g
 Simulium hirtinervis Edwards, 1928 c g
 Simulium hirtipannus Puri, 1932 c g
 Simulium hirtipupa Lutz, 1910 i c g
 Simulium hispaniola Grenier & Bertrand, 1954 c g
 Simulium hispidum Craig & Joy, 2000 c g
 Simulium hissetteum Gibbins, 1936 c g
 Simulium hmongense Takaoka g
 Simulium hoffmanni Vargas, 1943 i c g
 Simulium hoiseni Takaoka, 2008 c g
 Simulium hongpingense Cheng, Luo & Yang, 2006 c g
 Simulium hongthaii Takaoka & Sofian-Azirun g
 Simulium horacioi Okazawa & Onishi, 1980 c g
 Simulium horocochuspi Coscaron & Wygodzinsky, 1972 c g
 Simulium horokaense Ono, 1980 c g
 Simulium horvathi (Enderlein, 1922) c g
 Simulium howletti Puri, 1932 c g
 Simulium huaimorense Takaoka, Srisuka & Saeung, 2020 g
 Simulium huairayacu Wygodzinsky, 1953 c g
 Simulium huangi Huang, 2017 g
 Simulium huemul Wygodzinsky & Coscaron, 1967 c g
 Simulium huense Takaoka g
 Simulium hukaense Sechan, 1983 c g
 Simulium humerosum Rubtsov, 1947 c g
 Simulium hunanense Zhang & Chen, 2004 c g
 Simulium hunteri Malloch, 1914 i c g

I

 Simulium ibarakiense Takaoka & Saito, 2007 c g
 Simulium ibariense Zivkovic & Grenier, 1959 c g
 Simulium ibericum Crosskey & Santos Gracio, 1985 c g
 Simulium ibleum (Rivosecchi, 1966) c g
 Simulium ichnusae (Rivosecchi, 1993) c g
 Simulium ifugaoense Takaoka, 1983 c g
 Simulium ignacioi Perez and Vulcano, 1973 i
 Simulium ignescens Roubaud, 1906 i c g
 Simulium iguazuense Coscaron, 1976 c g
 Simulium imerinae Roubaud, 1905 c g
 Simulium immortalis Cai, An, Li &  Yan, 2004 c g
 Simulium impar Davies, Peterson and Wood, 1962 i c g
 Simulium impukane Meillon, 1936 c g
 Simulium inaequale Paterson Ans Shannon, 1927 i c g
 Simulium incanum (Loew, 1840) c g
 Simulium incertum Lutz, 1910 i c g
 Simulium incognitum Adler & Mason, 1997 c g
 Simulium incrustatum Lutz, 1910 i c g
 Simulium indica Singh Sidhu, 2005 c g
 Simulium indicum Becher, 1885 c g
 Simulium inermum Takaoka, 2003 c g
 Simulium inexorabile Schrottky, 1909 i
 Simulium infenestrum Moulton & Adler, 1995 c g
 Simulium infernale Adler, Currie & Wood, 2004 c g
 Simulium inflatum (Rubtsov, 1951) c g
 Simulium innocens (Shewell, 1952) i c g
 Simulium inornatum Mackerras & Mackerras, 1950 c g
 Simulium intermedium Roubaud, 1906 c g
 Simulium inthanonense Takaoka & Suzuki, 1984 c g
 Simulium inuitkiense Smart & Clifford, 1965 c g
 Simulium iphias Meillon, 1951 c g
 Simulium iracouboense Floch and Abonnenc, 1946 i c g
 Simulium irayense Takaoka, 2003 c g
 Simulium irianense Takaoka, 2003 c g
 Simulium iridescens Meijere, 1913 c g
 Simulium itaunense D'andretta and Gonzalez, 1964 i c g
 Simulium itelmenica (Chubareva & Yankovsky, 2006) c g
 Simulium ituriense Fain, 1951 c g
 Simulium itwariense  g
 Simulium ivashchenkoi (Yankovsky, 1996) c g
 Simulium ivdelensis Yankovsky, 2000 c g
 Simulium iwahigense Takaoka, 1983 c g
 Simulium iwatense (Shiraki, 1935) c g
 Simulium izuense Takaoka & Saito, 2005 c g

J

 Simulium jacobsi Dalmat, 1953 c g
 Simulium jacumbae Dyar and Shannon, 1927 i c g
 Simulium jacuticum Rubtsov, 1940 c g
 Simulium jaimeramirezi Wygodzinsky, 1971 i c g
 Simulium jani Lewis, 1973 c g
 Simulium janzeni Enderlein, 1922 c g
 Simulium janzi Abreu, 1961 c g
 Simulium japonicum Matsumura, 1931 c g
 Simulium jasgulemum Chubareva, 2000 c g
 Simulium jayapuraense Takaoka, 2003 c g
 Simulium jefersoni Hamada, Hernandez, Luz & Pepinelli, 2006 c g
 Simulium jeffreyi Takaoka & Davies, 1995 g
 Simulium jenningsi Malloch, 1914 i c g
 Simulium jerantutense Takaoka & Sofian-Azirun g
 Simulium jerezense Diaz Najera, 1969 c g
 Simulium jeteri Py-Daniel, 2005 c g
 Simulium jianjinshanense Zhang & Chen, 2006 c g
 Simulium jieyangense An, Yan & Yang, 1994 c g
 Simulium jilinense Chen & Cao, 1983 c g
 Simulium jilinensis Chen & Cao, 1983 c g
 Simulium jimmaense Uemoto, Ogata & Mebrahtu, 1977 c g
 Simulium jinbianense Zhang & Chen, 2004 c g
 Simulium jnabsium Craig, 1997 c g
 Simulium jobbinsi Vargas & Palacios, 1946 c g
 Simulium joculator Adler, Currie & Wood, 2004 c g
 Simulium johannae Wanson, 1947 c g
 Simulium johannseni Hart, 1912 i c g
 Simulium johnfrumi Craig, 2006 c g
 Simulium johnsoni Vargas & Najera, 1957 c g
 Simulium jolyi Roubaud, 1906 c g
 Simulium jonesi Stone and Snoddy, 1969 i c g
 Simulium josephi Smart & Clifford, 1965 c g
 Simulium joyae Craig & Joy, 2000 c g
 Simulium juarezi Vargas & Najera, 1957 c g
 Simulium jugatum Boldarueva, 1979 c g
 Simulium jujuyense Paterson and Shannon, 1927 i c g
 Simulium jundiaiense D'andretta and Gonzalez, 1964 i
 Simulium junkumae Takaoka, Srisuka & Saeung, 2020 g
 Simulium juxtacrenobium Bass & Brockhouse, 1990 c g
 Simulium juxtadamnosum Gouteux, 1978 c g

K

 Simulium kabanayense Perez and Volcano, 1973 i c g
 Simulium kachvorjanae Ussova, 1991 c g
 Simulium kaffaense Hadis, Wilson, Cobblah &  Boakye, 2005 c g
 Simulium kainantuense Smart & Clifford, 1965 c g
 Simulium kaiti Smart & Clifford, 1965 c g
 Simulium kalimerahense Takaoka, 2003 c g
 Simulium kambaitense Takaoka, 1989 c g
 Simulium kamimurai Takaoka, 2003 c g
 Simulium kamtshadalicum Yankovsky, 1996 c g
 Simulium kamtshaticum Rubtsov, 1940 c g
 Simulium kanchaveli (Machavariani, 1966) c g
 Simulium kapuri Datta, 1975 c g
 Simulium karasuae Panchenko, 1998 c g
 Simulium karavalliense Anbalagan, Rekha, Balachandran, Dinakaran & Krishnan, 2020 g
 Simulium karenkoense (Shiraki, 1935) c g
 Simulium kariyai (Takahasi, 1940) c g
 Simulium karzhantavicum (Rubtsov, 1956) c g
 Simulium kaszabi (Rubtsov, 1969) c g
 Simulium katangae Fain, 1951 c g
 Simulium katoi Shiraki, 1935 c g
 Simulium kauntzeum Gibbins, 1938 c g
 Simulium kawagishii Takaoka & Suzuki, 1995 c g
 Simulium kawamurae Matsummura, 1931 c g
 Simulium kazahstanicum (Rubtsov, 1976) c g
 Simulium keenani Field, 1969 c g
 Simulium keiseri (Rubtsov, 1955) c g
 Simulium keningauense Takaoka, 2008 c g
 Simulium kenyae Meillon, 1940 c g
 Simulium keravatense Smart & Clifford, 1965 c g
 Simulium kerei Takaoka & Suzuki, 1994 c g
 Simulium kerisorum (Rubtsov, 1956) c g
 Simulium kerzhneri (Rubtsov, 1975) c g
 Simulium khunklangense Takaoka & Srisuka g
 Simulium kiangaraense Pilaka & Elouard, 1999 c g
 Simulium kietaense Takaoka, 1995 c g
 Simulium kiewfinense Takaoka, Srisuka & Fukuda, 2020 g
 Simulium kiewmaepanense Takaoka, Srisuka & Saeung, 2017 g
 Simulium kilibanum Gouteux, 1977 c g
 Simulium kinabaluense Smart & Clifford, 1969 c g
 Simulium kingundense Fain & Elsen, 1974 c g
 Simulium kipengere Krueger, 2006 c g
 Simulium kirgisorum (Rubtsov, 1956) c g
 Simulium kiritshenkoi (Rubtsov, 1940) c g
 Simulium kisoense Uemoto, Onishi & Orii, 1974 c g
 Simulium kitetense Elsen & Post, 1989 c g
 Simulium kivuense Gouteux, 1978 c g
 Simulium klonglanense Takaoka, Srisuka & Saeung, 2020 g
 Simulium knidirii Giudicelli & Thiery, 1985 c g
 Simulium kobayashii Okamoto, Sato & Shogaki, 1958 c g
 Simulium koidzumii (Tashasi, 1940) c g
 Simulium kokodae Smart & Clifford, 1965 c g
 Simulium kolakaense Takaoka, 2003 c g
 Simulium kompi Dalmat, 1951 c g
 Simulium konakovi Rubtsov, 1956 c g
 Simulium konkourense Boakye, Post, Mosha & Quillevere, 1993 c g
 Simulium konoi (Takashasi, 1950) c g
 Simulium kozlovi Rubtsov, 1940 c g
 Simulium krebsorum Moulton & Adler, 1992 c g
 Simulium krishnani Anbalagan, Vijayan, Balachandran, Thiyonila & Surya, 2020 g
 Simulium krombeini Davies & Gyorkos, 1987 c g
 Simulium krymense (Rubtsov, 1956) c g
 Simulium kuandianense Chen & Cao, 1983 c g
 Simulium kuandianensis Chen & Cao, 1983 c g
 Simulium kugartsuense (Rubtsov, 1956) c g
 Simulium kugitangi Yankovsky & Shinkovsky, 1992 c g
 Simulium kuingingiense Smart & Clifford, 1965 c g
 Simulium kummbakkaraiense Anbalagan, Vijayan, Dinakaran & Krishnan, 2019 g
 Simulium kumboense Grenier & Germain, 1966 c g
 Simulium kurense Rubtsov & Dzhafarov, 1951 c g
 Simulium kurganense (Rubtsov, 1956) c g
 Simulium kurilense Rubtsov, 1956 c g
 Simulium kuznetzovi Rubtsov, 1940 c g
 Simulium kwangoense Fain & Elsen, 1974 c g
 Simulium kyushuense Takaoka, 1978 c g

L

 Simulium labellei Peterson, 1993 c g
 Simulium lacduongense Takaoka g
 Simulium laciniatum Edwards, 1924 c g
 Simulium lagunaense Takaoka, 1983 c g
 Simulium lahillei Paterson and Shannon, 1927 i c g
 Simulium lakei Snoddy, 1976 i c g
 Simulium lalokiense Smart & Clifford, 1965 c g
 Simulium lama Rubtsov, 1940 c g
 Simulium lamachi Doby & David, 1960 c g
 Simulium lamdongense Takaoka & Sofian-Azirun, 2015 g
 Simulium lampangense Takaoka & Choochote, 2005 c g
 Simulium landonoense Takaoka, 2003 c g
 Simulium laneportoi Vargas, 1941 i c g
 Simulium langbiangense Takaoka & Sofian-Azirun g
 Simulium languidum Davies & Gyorkos, 1988 c g
 Simulium laosense Takaoka, Srisuka & Saeung, 2017 g
 Simulium laoshanstum Ren, An & Kang, 1998 c g
 Simulium laplandica Chubareva & Yankovsky, 1992 c g
 Simulium lardizabalae Takaoka & Sofian-Azirun g
 Simulium larvipilosum Okazawa, 1984 c g
 Simulium larvispinosum Leon, 1948 c g
 Simulium lassmanni Vergas, Martinez, 1946 i c g
 Simulium laterale Edwards, 1933 c g
 Simulium laticalx Enderlein, 1933 i g
 Simulium latidigitus Enderlein, 1936 i g
 Simulium latifile (Rubtsov, 1956) c g
 Simulium latigonium (Rubtsov, 1956) c g
 Simulium latilobus Rubtsov, 1973 c g
 Simulium latimentum (Rubtsov, 1956) c g
 Simulium latipes Meigen, 1804 i c g
 Simulium latipollex (Enderlein, 1936) c g
 Simulium latistylum Takaoka, 1983 c g
 Simulium latitarsus Rubtsov, 1971 c g
 Simulium laui Takaoka & Sofian-Azirun, 2015 g
 Simulium lawnhillense Colbo, 1976 c g
 Simulium laxum Takaoka, 2003 c g
 Simulium leberrei Grenier & Germain, 1966 c g
 Simulium ledangense  g
 Simulium ledongense Yang & Chen, 2001 c g
 Simulium lehi Takaoka, 2001 c g
 Simulium leigongshanense Chen & Zhang, 1997 c g
 Simulium lemborense Takaoka & Sofian-Azirun g
 Simulium leonense Boakye, Post & Mosha, 1993 c g
 Simulium leopoldense Strieder & Py-Daniel, 2000 c g
 Simulium lepnevae (Rubtsov, 1956) c g
 Simulium letabum Meillon, 1935 c g
 Simulium letrasense Diaz Najera, 1969 c g
 Simulium lewisi Perez, 1971 i c g
 Simulium leytense Takaoka, 1983 c g
 Simulium liberiense Garms, 1973 c g
 Simulium lidiae (Semushin & Usova, 1983) c g
 Simulium lididae Semushin & Usova, 1983 c g
 Simulium lilianae Takaoka, 2000 c g
 Simulium liliwense Takaoka, 1983 c g
 Simulium lilotense (Rubtsov, 1971) c g
 Simulium limay Wygodzinsky, 1958 c g
 Simulium limbatum Knab, 1915 i c g
 Simulium linduense Takaoka, 2003 c g
 Simulium lineatum (Meigen, 1804) c g
 Simulium lineothorax Puri, 1932 c g
 Simulium lingziense Deng, Zhang & Chen, 1995 c g
 Simulium liriense Rivosecchi, 1961 c g
 Simulium litobranchium Hamada, Pepinelli, Mattos-Gloria & Luz g
 Simulium litoreum Datta, 1975 c g
 Simulium litshkense (Rubtsov, 1956) c g
 Simulium littopyga Evenhuis, 2017 g
 Simulium littosocius Evenhuis, 2017 g
 Simulium littosodalis Evenhuis, 2017 g
 Simulium lividum (Schellenberg, 1803) c g
 Simulium llutense Coscaron & Matta, 1982 c g
 Simulium lobatoi Dias, Hernandez, Maia-Herzog & Shelley, 2004 c g
 Simulium loeiense Takaoka, Srisuka & Fukuda, 2020 g
 Simulium loerchae Adler, 1987 c g
 Simulium lonchatum Chen, Zhang & Huang, 2005 c g
 Simulium lonckei Craig, 1997 c g
 Simulium longifiliatum (Rubtsov, 1976) c g
 Simulium longipalpe Beltyukova, 1955 c g
 Simulium longipes (Rubtsov, 1956) c g
 Simulium longirostre Smart, 1972 c g
 Simulium longistylatum Shewell, 1959 i c g
 Simulium longitarse (Rubtsov & Violovich, 1965) c g
 Simulium longithallum Diaz Najera & Vulcano, 1962 c g
 Simulium longitruncum Zhang & Chen, 2003 c g
 Simulium longlanhense Takaoka g
 Simulium longshengense Chen, Zhang & Zhang, 2007 c g
 Simulium longtanstum Ren Bing, An & Kang, 1998 c g
 Simulium lorense Takaoka, 2003 c g
 Simulium lotii Craig, 1987 c g
 Simulium lourencoi Py-Daniel, 1988 c g
 Simulium loutetense Grenier & Ovazza, 1951 c g
 Simulium loveridgei Crosskey, 1965 c g
 Simulium lowi Takaoka & Adler, 2017 g
 Simulium luadiense Elsen, Fain & Boeck, 1983 c g
 Simulium luchoi Coscaron & Wygodzinsky, 1972 c g
 Simulium lucyae Craig, 2006 c g
 Simulium ludingens Chen, Zhang & Huang, 2005 c g
 Simulium lugense Yankovsky, 1996 c g
 Simulium luggeri Nicholson and Mickel, 1950 i c g
 Simulium luliangense Chen & Lian g
 Simulium lumbwanum Meillon, 1944 c g
 Simulium lundstromi (Enderlein, 1921) c g
 Simulium lunduense Takaoka, 2008 c g
 Simulium luppovae (Rubtsov, 1956) c g
 Simulium luridum Takaoka, 2003 c g
 Simulium lurybayae Smart, 1944 i c g
 Simulium lushanense Chen, Kang & Zhang, 2007 c g
 Simulium lutzi Knab, 1913 c g
 Simulium lutzianum Pinto, 1931 i c g
 Simulium luzonicum Takaoka, 1983 c g

M

 Simulium macca (Enderlein, 1934) c g
 Simulium machadoallisoni Vulcano, 1981 i
 Simulium machadoi Luna de Carvalho, 1962 c g
 Simulium machetorum  g
 Simulium mackerrasorum Colbo, 1976 c g
 Simulium maculatum (Meigen, 1804) c g
 Simulium maehongsonense Takaoka, Srisuka & Saeung, 2020 g
 Simulium maelanoiense Takaoka, Srisuka & Saeung, 2020 g
 Simulium maenoi Takaoka & Choochote, 2002 c g
 Simulium maertensi Elsen, Fain & de Boeck, 1983 c g
 Simulium maewongense Takaoka, Srisuka & Saeung, 2020 g
 Simulium mafuluense Smart & Clifford, 1965 c g
 Simulium magnum Lane & Porto, 1940 c g
 Simulium mainitense Takaoka, Tenedero, 2019 g
 Simulium major Lane and Porto, 1940 i g
 Simulium makartshenkovi Bodrova, 1987 c g
 Simulium makilingense Takaoka, 1983 c g
 Simulium maklarini Takaoka, 2007 c g
 Simulium malaibaense Takaoka & Tenedero, 2007 c g
 Simulium malardei Craig, 1987 c g
 Simulium malayense Takaoka & Davies, 1995 g
 Simulium malinoense Takaoka, 2003 c g
 Simulium malukuense Takaoka, 2003 c g
 Simulium malyschevi Dorog., Rubtsov, and Vlasenko, 1935 i c g
 Simulium mamasaense Takaoka, 2003 c g
 Simulium manadoense Takaoka, 2003 c g
 Simulium manbucalense Takaoka, 1983 c g
 Simulium manense Elsen & Escaffre, 1976 c g
 Simulium mangabeirai Vargas, 1945 c g
 Simulium mangasepi Takaoka, 1983 c g
 Simulium manicatum Enderlein, 1933 i g
 Simulium manokwariense Takaoka, 2003 c g
 Simulium manooni Takaoka & Choochote, 2005 c g
 Simulium manuselaense Takaoka, 2003 c g
 Simulium maraaense Craig, 1997 c g
 Simulium maranguapense Pessoa, Rios-Velasquez & Py-Daniel, 2005 c g
 Simulium marathrumi Fairchild, 1940 c g
 Simulium margaritae (Rubtsov, 1956) c g
 Simulium margaritatum Pepinelli, Hamada & Luz, 2006 c g
 Simulium mariavulcanoae Coscaron & Wygodzinsky, 1984 c g
 Simulium maritimum (Rubtsov, 1956) c g
 Simulium marlieri Grenier, 1950 c g
 Simulium marocanum Bouzidi & Giudicelli, 1988 c g
 Simulium maroniense Floch and Abonnenc, 1946 i g
 Simulium marosense Takaoka, Sofian-Azirun & Suana, 2019 g
 Simulium marquezi Vargas & Diaz Najera, 1957 c g
 Simulium marsicanum (Rivosecchi, 1962) c g
 Simulium masabae Gibbins, 1934 c g
 Simulium masilauense Takaoka, 2008 c g
 Simulium mataverense Craig & Craig, 1987 c g
 Simulium matokoense Smart & Clifford, 1965 c g
 Simulium matteabranchia Anduze, 1947 i
 Simulium matteabranchium Anduze, 1947 c g
 Simulium mauense Nunes de Mello, 1974 c g
 Simulium maximum (Knoz, 1961) c g
 Simulium mayuchuspi Coscaron, 1990 c g
 Simulium mayumbense Fain & Elsen, 1973 c g
 Simulium mazzottii Diaz Najera, 1981 c g
 Simulium mbarigui Coscaron and Wygodzinsky, 1973 i
 Simulium mcmahoni Meillon, 1940 c g
 Simulium meadowi Mahe, Ma & An, 2003 c g
 Simulium mediaxisus An, Guo & Xu, 1995 c g
 Simulium mediocoloratum Takaoka, 2006 c g
 Simulium mediodentatum Takaoka, 2003 c g
 Simulium mediovittatum Knab, 1916 i c g
 Simulium medusaeforme Pomeroy, 1920 c g
 Simulium meigeni (Rubtsov & Carlsson, 1965) c g
 Simulium melanocephalum Gouteux, 1978 c g
 Simulium melanopus Edwards, 1929 c g
 Simulium melatum Wharton, 1949 c g
 Simulium mellah Giudicelli, Bouzidi & Ait Abdelaali, 2000 c g
 Simulium menchacai Vargas & Najera, 1957 c g
 Simulium mendiense Smart & Clifford, 1965 c g
 Simulium mengense Vajime & Dunbar, 1979 c g
 Simulium mengi Chen, Zhang & Wen, 2000 c g
 Simulium menglaense Chen, 2003 c g
 Simulium merga Takaoka & Choochote, 2005 c g
 Simulium meridionale Riley, 1887 i c g
 Simulium merops Meillon, 1950 c g
 Simulium merritti Adler, Currie & Wood, 2004 c g
 Simulium meruoca Mello, Almeida, Dellome, 1973 i
 Simulium mesasiaticum Rubtsov, 1947 c g
 Simulium mesodontium Craig, 1987 c g
 Simulium metallicum Bellardi, 1859 i c g
 Simulium metatrsale Brunetti, 1911 c g
 Simulium metecontae Elouard & Pilaka, 1996 c g
 Simulium mexicanum Bellardi, 1862 i
 Simulium meyerae Moulton & Adler, 2002 c g
 Simulium miblosi Takaoka, 1983 c g
 Simulium microbranchium Dalmat, 1949 c g
 Simulium microlepidum Elsen, Fain & de Boeck, 1983 c g
 Simulium middlemissae Craig, 1997 c g
 Simulium mie Ogata & Sasa, 1954 c g
 Simulium milloti Grenier & Doucet, 1949 c g
 Simulium minahasaense Takaoka, 2003 c g
 Simulium minangkabaum Takaoka & Sigit, 1997 c g
 Simulium mindanaoense Takaoka, 1983 c g
 Simulium mindoroense Takaoka & Tenedero, 2007 c g
 Simulium minji Smart & Clifford, 1965 c g
 Simulium minuanum Strieder & Coscaron, 2000 c g
 Simulium minus (Dyar and Shannon, 1927) i c g
 Simulium minusculum Lutz i c g
 Simulium minuticorpus (Yankovsky, 1996) c g
 Simulium minutum (Rubtsov, 1959) c
 Simulium miyagii Takaoka, 2003 c g
 Simulium modicum Adler, Currie & Wood, 2004 c g
 Simulium mogii Takaoka, 2003 c g
 Simulium molliculum Takaoka, 2003 c g
 Simulium mongolense Yankovsky, 1996 c g
 Simulium mongolicum (Rubtsov, 1969) c g
 Simulium montiblense Takaoka, 1983 c g
 Simulium monticola Friederichs, 1920 c g
 Simulium monticoloides (Rubtsov, 1956) c g
 Simulium montium (Rubtsov, 1947) c g
 Simulium montshadskii (Rubtsov, 1956) c g
 Simulium morae Perez, Rassi, Ramirez, 1977 i c g
 Simulium morisonoi Takaoka, 1973 c g
 Simulium morsitans Edwards, 1915 c g
 Simulium motoyukii Takaoka, 2003 c g
 Simulium moucheti Gouteux, 1977 c g
 Simulium moultoni Adler, Currie & Wood, 2004 c g
 Simulium moxiense Chen, Huang & Zhang, 2005 c g
 Simulium muangpanense Takaoka, Srisuka & Fukuda, 2020 g
 Simulium multiclavulatum Fain, Elsen & Dujardin, 1989 c g
 Simulium multidentatum Bodrova, 1988 c g
 Simulium multifurcatum Zhang, 1991 c g
 Simulium multistriatum Rubtsov, 1947 c g
 Simulium mumfordi Edwards, 1932 c g
 Simulium munumense Smart & Clifford, 1965 c g
 Simulium murvanidzei (Rubtsov, 1955) c g
 Simulium mussauense Delfinado, 1971 c g
 Simulium mutucuna Mello and Silva, 1974 i c g
 Simulium myanmarense Takaoka, Srisuka & Saeung, 2017 g
 Simulium mysterium Adler, Currie & Wood, 2004 c g

N

 Simulium nacojapi Smart, 1944 c g
 Simulium nahimi Py-Daniel, 1984 c g
 Simulium nakhonense Takaoka & Suzuki, 1984 c g
 Simulium nakkhoense Takaoka & Suzuki, 1984 c g
 Simulium namdanense Takaoka, Srisuka & Saeung, 2020 g
 Simulium namense Takaoka, 1989 c g
 Simulium nami Smart & Clifford, 1965 c g
 Simulium nanoiense Takaoka, Srisuka & Saeung, 2020 g
 Simulium nanthaburiense Takaoka, Srisuka & Fukuda, 2020 g
 Simulium nanum Zetterstedt, 1838 c g
 Simulium napuense Takaoka, 2003 c g
 Simulium narcaeum Meillon, 1950 c g
 Simulium natalense Meillon, 1950 c g
 Simulium naturale Davies, 1966 c g
 Simulium neavei Roubaud, 1915 c g
 Simulium nebulicola Edwards, 1934 c g
 Simulium nebulosum Currie and Adler, 1986 i c g
 Simulium negativum Adler, Currie & Wood, 2004 c g
 Simulium neireti Roubaud, 1905 c g
 Simulium nemorale Edwards, 1931 c g
 Simulium nemorivagum Datta, 1973 c g
 Simulium nemuroense Takaoka & Saito, 2002 c g
 Simulium neornatipes Dumbleton, 1969 c g
 Simulium neoviceps Craig, 1987 c g
 Simulium nepalense Lewis, 1964 c g
 Simulium netteli Diaz Najera, 1969 c g
 Simulium ngabogei Fain, 1950 c g
 Simulium nganganum Elsen, Fain & de Boeck, 1983 c g
 Simulium ngaoense Takaoka, Srisuka & Saeung, 2018 g
 Simulium ngouense Fain & Elsen, 1973 c g
 Simulium nicholsoni Mackerras & Mackerras, 1948 c g
 Simulium nigricorne Dalmat, 1950 c g
 Simulium nigricoxum Stone, 1050 i c g
 Simulium nigrifacies Datta, 1974 c g
 Simulium nigrifemur (Enderlein, 1936) c g
 Simulium nigrimanum Macquart, 1838 c g
 Simulium nigripilosum Edwards, 1933 c g
 Simulium nigristrigatum (Enderlein, 1930) c g
 Simulium nigritarse Coquillett, 1902 c g
 Simulium nigrofemoralum Chen & Zhang, 2001 c g
 Simulium nigrofilum Takaoka & Sofian-Azirun g
 Simulium nigrofusipes Rubtsov, 1947 c g
 Simulium nigrogilvum Summers, 1911 c g
 Simulium nigrum (Meigen, 1804) c g
 Simulium niha Giuducelli & Dia, 1986 c g
 Simulium nikkoense Shiraki, 1935 c g
 Simulium nilesi Rambajan, 1979 c g
 Simulium nilgiricum Puri, 1932 c g
 Simulium nili Gibbins, 1934 c g
 Simulium nishijimai (Ono, 1978) c g
 Simulium nitidithorax Puri, 1932 c g
 Simulium nobile Meijere, 1907 c g
 Simulium nodosum Puri, 1933 c g
 Simulium noelleri Friederichs, 1920 c g
 Simulium nogueirai D'andretta and Gonzalez, 1964 i
 Simulium noguerai d'Andretta & Gonzalez, 1964 c g
 Simulium norfolkense Dumbleton, 1969 c g
 Simulium norforense Takaoka, 2003 c g
 Simulium noroense Takaoka & Suzuki, 1995 c g
 Simulium notatum Adams, 1904 i c g
 Simulium notiale Stone and Snoddy, 1969 i c g
 Simulium novemarticulatum Takaoka & Davies, 1995 g
 Simulium novigracilis Deng, Zhang & Xue, 1996 c g
 Simulium novolineatum Puri, 1933 c g
 Simulium nubis Davies & Gyorkos, 1987 c g
 Simulium nudifrons Takaoka, 2003 c g
 Simulium nudipes Takaoka, 2003 c g
 Simulium nujiangense Xue, 1993 c g
 Simulium nunesdemelloi Hamada, Pepinelli & Hernandez, 2006 c g
 Simulium nunestovari Perez, Rassi, and Ramirez, 1977 i g
 Simulium nuneztovari Perez, Rassi & Ramirez, 1977 c g
 Simulium nyaense Gouteux, 1977 c g
 Simulium nyanzense Fain & Dujardin, 1983 c g
 Simulium nyasalandicum Meillon, 1930 c g
 Simulium nyssa Stone and Snoddy, 1969 i c g

O

 Simulium obesum Vulcano, 1959 i c g
 Simulium obichingoum Chubareva, 2000 c g
 Simulium obikumbense (Rubtsov, 1972) c g
 Simulium oblongum Takaoka & Choochote, 2005 c g
 Simulium ochoai Vargas, Palacios & Najera, 1946 c g
 Simulium ochraceum Walker, 1861 i c g
 Simulium ochreacum Walker, 1861 g
 Simulium ochrescentipes Enderlein, 1921 c g
 Simulium ocreastylum (Rubtsov, 1956) c g
 Simulium octofiliatum (Rubtsov, 1956) c g
 Simulium octospicae Gibbins, 1937 c g
 Simulium oculatum (Enderlein, 1936) c g
 Simulium odontostylum Rubtsov, 1947 c g
 Simulium ogatai (Rubtsov, 1962) c g
 Simulium ogonukii Takaoka, 1983 c g
 Simulium oguamai Lewis & Disney, 1972 c g
 Simulium oitanum (Shiraki, 1935) c g
 Simulium okinawaense Takaoka, 1976 c g
 Simulium oligotuberculatum (Knoz, 1965) c g
 Simulium olimpicum Diaz Najera, 1969 c g
 Simulium olonicum (Usova, 1961) c g
 Simulium omorii (Takahasi, 1942) c g
 Simulium omutaense Ogata & Sasa, 1954 c g
 Simulium onoi Yankovsky, 1996 c g
 Simulium onum Bodrova, 1988 c g
 Simulium opalinifrons Enderlein, 1934 i g
 Simulium opunohuense Craig, 1987 c g
 Simulium orbitale Lutz, 1910 i c g
 Simulium oresti Vorobets, 1984 c g
 Simulium ornatipes Skuse, 1890 c g
 Simulium ornatum (Meigen, 1818) c g
 Simulium orsovae Smart, 1944 c g
 Simulium ortizi Perez, 1971 i g
 Simulium oshimaense Ono, 1989 c g
 Simulium oshimanum Shiraki, 1935 c g
 Simulium ovazzae Grenier & Mouchet, 1959 c g
 Simulium oviceps Edwards, 1933 c g
 Simulium oviedoi Perez, 1971 i c g
 Simulium oyapockense Floch and Abonnenc, 1946 i c g
 Simulium ozarkense Moulton & Adler, 1995 c g

P

 Simulium padangense Takaoka & Sigit, 1997 c g
 Simulium pahangense Takaoka & Davies, 1995 c g
 Simulium palauense Stone, 1964 c g
 Simulium palawanense Delfinado, 1971 c g
 Simulium pallidicranium Craig & Joy, 2000 c g
 Simulium pallidofemur Deng, Zhang & Xue, 1994 c g
 Simulium pallidum Puri, 1932 c g
 Simulium palmatum Puri, 1932 c g
 Simulium palmeri Pomeroy, 1922 c g
 Simulium palniense Puri, 1933 c g
 Simulium palopoense Takaoka, 2003 c g
 Simulium palustre Rubtsov, 1956 c g
 Simulium pamahaense Takaoka, 2003 c g
 Simulium panamense Fairchild, 1940 c g
 Simulium pandanophilum Kruger, Nurmi & Garms, 1998 c g
 Simulium pangunaense Takaoka, 1995 c g
 Simulium pankumuense Craig, 2006 c g
 Simulium papaveroi Coscaron, 1982 c g
 Simulium papuense Wharton, 1948 c g
 Simulium paracarolinae Coscaron, 2004 c g
 Simulium paracorniferum (Yankovsky, 1979) c g
 Simulium paradisium Craig, 2006 c g
 Simulium paraequinum Puri, 1933 c g
 Simulium paraguayense Schrottky, 1909 i c g
 Simulium parahiyangum Takaoka & Sigit, 1992 c g
 Simulium paralongipalpe Worobez, 1987 c g
 Simulium paraloutetense Crosskey, 1988 c g
 Simulium paramorsitans Rubtsov, 1956 c g
 Simulium paranense Schrottky, 1909 i c g
 Simulium paranubis Davies & Gyorkos, 1992 c g
 Simulium parapusillum (Rubtsov, 1956) c g
 Simulium parargyreatum Rubtsov, 1979 c g
 Simulium parawaterfallum Zhang, Yang & Chen, 2003 c g
 Simulium parimaensis Perez, Yarzabal & Takaoka, 1986 c g
 Simulium parmatum Adler, Currie & Wood, 2004 c g
 Simulium parnassum Malloch, 1914 i c g
 Simulium parrai Vargas & Palacios, 1946 c g
 Simulium parvulum Takaoka, 2003 c g
 Simulium parvum Enderlein, 1921 c g
 Simulium pathrushevae (Boldarueva, 1979) c g
 Simulium patrushevae (Ivashchenko, 1978) c
 Simulium pattoni Senior-White, 1922 c g
 Simulium patzicianense Takaoka & Takahasi, 1982 c g
 Simulium paucicuspis (Rubtsov, 1947) c g
 Simulium pauliani Grenier & Doucet, 1949 c g
 Simulium pautense Coscaron & Takaoka, 1989 c g
 Simulium pavlovskii Rubtsov, 1940 c g
 Simulium paynei Vargas, 1942 i c g
 Simulium pegalanense Smart & Clifford, 1969 c g
 Simulium peggyae Takaoka, 1995 c g
 Simulium pekingense Sun, 1999 c g
 Simulium penai Wygodzinsky & Coscaron, 1970 c g
 Simulium penobscotensis Snoddy and Bauer, 1978 i c g
 Simulium pentaceros Grenier & Brunhes, 1972 c g
 Simulium perakense Takaoka, Ya'cob & Sofian-Azirun, 2018 g
 Simulium peregrinum Mackerras & Mackerras, 1950 c g
 Simulium perflavum Roubaud, 1906 i c g
 Simulium perforatum Fain & Dujardin, 1983 c g
 Simulium perlucidulum Takaoka, 1983 c g
 Simulium perplexum Shelley, Maia-Herzog & Luna Dias, 1989 c g
 Simulium pertinax Kollar, 1832 i c g
 Simulium peskovi Ismagulov & Koshkimbaev, 1996 c g
 Simulium peteri Anbalagan g
 Simulium petersoni Stone and Defoliart, 1959 i c g
 Simulium petricolum (Rivosecchi, 1963) g
 Simulium petropoliense Coscaron, 1981 c g
 Simulium phami Takaoka & Sofian-Azirun g
 Simulium phapeungense Takaoka, Srisuka & Fukuda, 2020 g
 Simulium phayaoense Takaoka & Choochote, 2005 c g
 Simulium philippianum Pinto, 1932 c g
 Simulium philippii Coscaron, 1976 c g
 Simulium philipponi Elouard & Pilaka, 1997 c g
 Simulium phluktainae Pilaka & Elouard, 1999 c g
 Simulium phraense Takaoka, Srisuka & Saeung, 2018 g
 Simulium phulocense Takaoka & Chen, 2015 g
 Simulium phurueaense Tangkawanit, Wongpakam & Pramual, 2018 g
 Simulium pichi Wygodzinsky & Coscaron, 1967 c g
 Simulium pichoni Craig, Fossati & Sechan, 1995 c g
 Simulium pictipes Hagen, 1880 i c g
 Simulium pifanoi Perez, 1971 i c g
 Simulium pilosum (Knowlton and Rowe, 1934) i c g
 Simulium pindiensis Khatoon & Hasan, 1996 c g
 Simulium pingtungense Huang & Takaoka, 2008 g
 Simulium pinhaoi Santos Gracio, 1985 g
 Simulium pintoi D'andretta and D'andretta, 1946 i c g
 Simulium piperi Dyar and Shannon, 1927 i c g
 Simulium piscicidium Riley, 1870 c g
 Simulium pitasawatae Takaoka, Srisuka & Saeung, 2020 g
 Simulium pitense Carlsson, 1962 c g
 Simulium planipuparium Rubtsov, 1947 c g
 Simulium platytarse (Yankovsky, 1977) c g
 Simulium plumbeum Krueger, 2006 c g
 Simulium podostemi Snoddy, 1971 i c g
 Simulium pohaense Takaoka & Suzuki, 1995 c g
 Simulium polare Rubtsov, 1940 c g
 Simulium politum Crosskey, 1977 c g
 Simulium polyprominulum Chen & Lian g
 Simulium pontinum Rivosecchi, 1960 c g
 Simulium popowae Rubtsov, 1940 c g
 Simulium posticatum (Meigen, 1838) c g
 Simulium praelargum Datta, 1973 c g
 Simulium prafiense Takaoka, 2003 c g
 Simulium prayongi Takaoka & Choochote, 2005 c g
 Simulium proctorae Craig, 1997 c g
 Simulium prodexargenteum (Enderlein, 1936) i c g
 Simulium prominentum Chen & Zhang, 2002 c g
 Simulium promorsitans Rubtsov, 1956 c g
 Simulium pruinosum Lutz, 1910 i
 Simulium prumirimense Corcaron, 1981 c g
 Simulium pseudequinum Seguy, 1921 c g
 Simulium pseudoamazonicum Perez & Peterson, 1981 c g
 Simulium pseudoantillarum Ramirez-Perez & Vulcano, 1973 c g
 Simulium pseudocallidum Diaz Najera, 1965 c g
 Simulium pseudocorium Craig & Joy, 2000 c g
 Simulium pseudoexiguum Mello and Almeida, 1974 i c g
 Simulium pseudonearcticum Rubtsov, 1940 c g
 Simulium pseudopusillum (Rubtsov, 1956) c g
 Simulium puaense Takaoka, Srisuka & Saeung, 2020 g
 Simulium pufauense Craig, 1997 c g
 Simulium pugetense (Dyar and Shannon, 1927) i c g
 Simulium puigi Vargas & Palacios, 1945 c g
 Simulium pukaengense Takaoka & Choochote, 2005 c g
 Simulium pulanotum An, Guo & Xu, 1995 c g
 Simulium pulchripes Austen, 1925 c g
 Simulium pulchrum Philippi, 1865 c g
 Simulium puliense Takaoka, 1979 c g
 Simulium pullus Rubtsov, 1956 c g
 Simulium pulverulentum Knab, 1914 i c g
 Simulium purii Datta, 1973 c g
 Simulium purosae Smart & Clifford, 1965 c g
 Simulium pusillum Fries, 1824 c g
 Simulium putre Coscaron & Matta, 1982 c g

Q

 Simulium qianense Chen & Chen, 2001 c g
 Simulium qiaolaoense Chen, 2001 c g
 Simulium qinghaiense Liu,  Gong, Zhang, Luo &  An, 2003 c g
 Simulium qingshuiense Chen, 2001 c g
 Simulium qingxilingense Cai & An, 2005 c g
 Simulium qini Cao, Wang & Chen, 1993 c g
 Simulium qiongzhouense Chen, Zhang & Yang, 2003 c g
 Simulium quadratum (Stains & Knowlton, 1943) c g
 Simulium quadrifidum Lutz, 1917 i c g
 Simulium quadrifila (Grenier, Faure & Laurent, 1957) c g
 Simulium quadristrigatum Enderlein, 1933 i c g
 Simulium quadrivittatum Loew i c g
 Simulium quasidecolletum Crosskey, 1988 c g
 Simulium quasifrenum Delfinado, 1971 c g
 Simulium quattuordecimfiliatum (Rubtsov, 1976) c g
 Simulium quatturodecimfilum Rubtsov, 1947 c g
 Simulium quebecense Twinn, 1936 i c g
 Simulium quechuanum Coscaron & Wygodzinsky, 1972 c g
 Simulium quilleverei Pilaka & Elouard, 1999 c g
 Simulium quimbayium  g
 Simulium quinquefiliatum Takaoka, 2003 c g
 Simulium quinquestriatum (Shiraki, 1935) c g
 Simulium quychauense Takaoka & Chen g

R

 Simulium racenisi Perez, 1971 i c g
 Simulium raivavaense Craig & Porch g
 Simulium ramosum Puri, 1932 c g
 Simulium ramulosum Chen, 2000 c g
 Simulium ranauense Takaoka, 2006 c g
 Simulium rangeli Perez, 1977 i c g
 Simulium rangiferinum (Rubtsov, 1956) c g
 Simulium ransikiense Takaoka, 2003 c g
 Simulium raohense Cai & Yao, 2006 c g
 Simulium rappae Py-Daniel & Coscaron, 1982 c g
 Simulium rashidi Lewis, 1973 c g
 Simulium rasyani Garms, Kerner & Meredith, 1988 c g
 Simulium raunsimnae Smart & Clifford, 1965 c g
 Simulium raybouldi Fain & Dujardin, 1983 c g
 Simulium rayohense Smart & Clifford, 1969 c g
 Simulium rebunense (Ono, 1979) c g
 Simulium recurvum Takaoka, 1983 c g
 Simulium reginae Terteryan, 1949 c g
 Simulium remissum Moulton & Adler, 1995 c g
 Simulium remotum Rubtsov, 1956 c g
 Simulium rendalense (Golini, 1975) c g
 Simulium repertum Elsen, Fain & de Boeck, 1983 c g
 Simulium reptans (Linnaeus, 1758) c g
 Simulium resimum Takaoka, 1983 c g
 Simulium retusum Delfinado, 1971 c g
 Simulium rezvoi Rubtsov, 1956 c g
 Simulium rheophilum Tan & Chow, 1976 c g
 Simulium rhodesinese Meillon, 1942 c g
 Simulium rhopaloides Craig, Englund & Takaoka, 2006 c g
 Simulium rickenbachi Germain & Mouchet, 1966 c g
 Simulium riograndense Py-Daniel, Souza & Caldas, 1988 c g
 Simulium rithrogenophila Konurbayev, 1984 c
 Simulium rithrogenophilum Konurbayev, 1984 c g
 Simulium rivasi Perez, 1971 i c g
 Simulium riverai Takaoka, 1983 c g
 Simulium rivi (Ivashchenko, 1970) g
 Simulium rivierei Craig, Fossati & Sechan, 1995 c g
 Simulium rivosecchii (Contini, 1965) c g
 Simulium rivuli Twinn, 1936 i g
 Simulium robynae Peterson, 1993 c g
 Simulium rodhaini Fain, 1950 c g
 Simulium romanai Wygodzinsky, 1951 c g
 Simulium roquemayu Coscaron, 1985 c g
 Simulium roraimense Nunes de Mello, 1974 c g
 Simulium rorotaense Floch and Abonnenc, 1946 i c g
 Simulium rosemaryae Takaoka & Roberts, 1988 c g
 Simulium rothfelsi Adler, Brockhouse & Currie, 2003 c g
 Simulium rotifilis Chen & Zhang, 1998 c g
 Simulium rotundatum (Rubtsov, 1956) c g
 Simulium rotundum Gibbins, 1936 c g
 Simulium rounae Smart & Clifford, 1965 c g
 Simulium ruandae Fain, 1950 c g
 Simulium rubescens Fain & Dujardin, 1983 c g
 Simulium rubicundulum Knab, 1915 c g
 Simulium rubiginosum Enderlein, 1933 i c g
 Simulium rubrithorax Lutz, 1909 i c g
 Simulium rubroflavifemur Rubtsov, 1940 c g
 Simulium rubtzovi Smart, 1945 i c g
 Simulium rubzovianum Sherban, 1961 g
 Simulium rubzovium (Ivashchenko, 1978) c g
 Simulium rufibasis Brunetti, 1911 c g
 Simulium ruficorne Macquart, 1838 c g
 Simulium rufithorax Brunetti, 1911 c g
 Simulium rugglesi Nicholson and Mickel, 1950 i c g
 Simulium ruizi Vargas & Najera, 1948 c g
 Simulium rurutuense Craig, 1997 c g
 Simulium rutherfoordi Meillon, 1937 c g

S

 Simulium sabahense Smart & Clifford, 1969 c g
 Simulium saccai (Rivosecchi, 1967) c g
 Simulium saccatum (Rubtsov, 1956) c g
 Simulium sacculiferum Fain & Dujardin, 1983 c g
 Simulium saeungae Takaoka & Srisuka, 2018 g
 Simulium saihoense Smart & Clifford, 1965 c g
 Simulium sakhalinum (Rubtsov, 1962) c g
 Simulium sakishimaense Takaoka, 1977 c g
 Simulium salazarae Takaoka, 1983 c g
 Simulium salebrosum Takaoka, 1983 c g
 Simulium saliceti (Rubtsov, 1971) c g
 Simulium salinum (Rubtsov, 1956) c g
 Simulium samarkandica Yankovsky, 2000 c g
 Simulium samboni Jennings, 1915 i c g
 Simulium sanctipauli Vajime & Dunbar, 1975 c g
 Simulium sandyi Coscaron, Ibanez-Bernal & Coscaron-Arias, 1999 c g
 Simulium sangrense (Rivosecchi, 1967) c g
 Simulium sanguineum Knab, 1915 i c g
 Simulium sansahoense Takaoka & Chen g
 Simulium santomi Mustapha, 2004 c g
 Simulium saradzhoense (Rubtsov, 1956) c g
 Simulium sarawakense Takaoka, 2001 c g
 Simulium sasai (Rubstov, 1962) c g
 Simulium sastscheri Machavariani, 1966 c g
 Simulium satsumense Takaoka, 1976 c g
 Simulium savici (Baranov, 1937) c g
 Simulium saxosum Adler, Currie & Wood, 2004 c g
 Simulium sazalyi Takaoka, Ya'cob & Low, 2018 g
 Simulium schamili (Rubtsov, 1964) c g
 Simulium schevyakovi Dorogostaisky & Rubtsov, 1935 c g
 Simulium schizolomum Deng, Zhang & Chen, 1995 c g
 Simulium schizostylum Chen & Zhang g
 Simulium schmidtmummi Wygodzinsky, 1973 i c g
 Simulium schoenemanni Enderlein, 1934 c g
 Simulium schoutedeni Wanson, 1947 c g
 Simulium schwetzi Wanson, 1947 c g
 Simulium scutellatum (Lane & Porto, 1940) c g
 Simulium scutistriatum Lutz, 1909 i c g
 Simulium sechani Craig & Fossati, 1995 c g
 Simulium segusina (Couvert, 1968) c g
 Simulium selewynense Takaoka & Suzuki, 1995 c g
 Simulium selwynense Takaoka & Suzuki, 1995 c g
 Simulium semushini Usova & Zinchenko, 1992 c g
 Simulium senile Brunetti, 1911 c g
 Simulium septentrionale (Tan & Chow, 1976) c g
 Simulium seramense Takaoka, 2003 c g
 Simulium serenum Huang & Takaoka, 2009 g
 Simulium sergenti Edwards, 1923 c g
 Simulium seriatum Knab, 1914 i
 Simulium serranus Coscaron, 1981 c g
 Simulium serratum Takaoka, 2003 c g
 Simulium setsukoae Takaoka & Choochote, 2004 c g
 Simulium sexafile (Rubtsov, 1976) c g
 Simulium sexiens Meillon, 1944 c g
 Simulium shadini (Rubtsov, 1956) c g
 Simulium shandongense Sun & Li, 2000 c g
 Simulium shangchuanense An & Hao, 1998 c g
 Simulium shannonae Craig, 1997 c g
 Simulium shanxiense Cai, An, Li &  Yan, 2004 c g
 Simulium sheilae Takaoka & Davies, 1995 g
 Simulium shennongjiaense Yang, Luo & Chen, 2005 c g
 Simulium sherwoodi Stone & Maffi, 1971 c g
 Simulium sheveligiense (Rubtsov & Violovich, 1965) c g
 Simulium shevtshenkovae Rubtsov, 1965 c g
 Simulium shewellianum Coscaron, 1985 c g
 Simulium shiraki Kono & Takahasi, 1940 c g
 Simulium shoae Grenier & Ovazza, 1956 c g
 Simulium shogakii (Rubtsov, 1962) c g
 Simulium siamense Takaoka & Suzuki, 1984 c g
 Simulium sicuani Smart, 1944 i c g
 Simulium silvaticum (Rubtsov, 1962) c g
 Simulium silvestre (Rubtsov, 1956) c g
 Simulium simianshanensis Wang, Li & Sun, 1996 c g
 Simulium simile Silva Figueroa, 1917 c g
 Simulium simplex Gibbins, 1936 c g
 Simulium simplicicolor Lutz, 1910 i
 Simulium simulacrum Delfinado, 1969 c g
 Simulium simulans Rubtsov, 1956 c g
 Simulium sinense (Enderlein, 1934) c g
 Simulium singgihi Takaoka, 2003 c g
 Simulium singtamense Datta & Pal, 1975 c g
 Simulium siolii Py-Daniel, 1988 c g
 Simulium sirbanum Vajime & Dunbar, 1975 c g
 Simulium sirimonense Fain & Dujardin, 1983 c g
 Simulium slossonae Dyar and Shannon, 1927 i c g
 Simulium smarti Vargas, 1946 c g
 Simulium snowi Stone and Snoddy, 1969 i c g
 Simulium solarii Stone, 1948 i c g
 Simulium solomonense Takaoka & Suzuki, 1995 c g
 Simulium songense Takaoka, Srisuka & Fukuda, 2020 g
 Simulium sonkulense Yankovsky, 2000 c g
 Simulium sorongense Takaoka, 2003 c g
 Simulium soubrense Vajime & Dunbar, 1975 c g
 Simulium souzalopesi Coscaron, 1981 c g
 Simulium spadicidorsum (Enderlein, 1934) i
 Simulium speculiventre Enderlein, 1914 c g
 Simulium spilmani Stone, 1969 c g
 Simulium spinibranchium Lutz, 1910 i c g
 Simulium spinifer Knab, 1914 i c g
 Simulium spinosibranchium Takaoka, 1983 c g
 Simulium spinulicorne Fain & Elsen, 1980 c g
 Simulium spiroi Craig, Currie & Hunter, 2006 c g
 Simulium splendidum Rubtsov, 1940 c g
 Simulium spoonatum An & Yan, 1998 c g
 Simulium squamosum (Enderlein, 1921) c g
 Simulium srisukai Takaoka & Saeung, 2017 g
 Simulium stackelbergi (Rubtsov, 1956) c g
 Simulium standfasti Colbo, 1976 c g
 Simulium starmuhlneri Grenier & Grjebine, 1964 c g
 Simulium steatopygium Craig, 2006 c g
 Simulium stellatum Gil-Azevedo, Figueiro & Maia-Herzog, 2005 c g
 Simulium stelliferum Coscaron & Wygodzinsky, 1972 c g
 Simulium stenophallum Terteryan, 1952 c g
 Simulium stevensoni Edwards, 1927 c g
 Simulium strelkovi (Rubtsov, 1956) c g
 Simulium striatum Brunetti, 1912 c g
 Simulium strigatum (Enderlein, 1933) i
 Simulium strigidorsum (Enderlein, 1933) i c g
 Simulium striginotum (Enderlein, 1933) i c g
 Simulium suarezi Perez, Rassi and Ramirez, 1977 i c g
 Simulium subatrum Takaoka, 1983 c g
 Simulium subclavibranchium Lutz, 1910 i c g
 Simulium subcostatum (Takahasi, 1950) c g
 Simulium subexiguum Field, 1967 c g
 Simulium subgriseum Rubtsov, 1940 c g
 Simulium sublonckei Craig, 2004 c g
 Simulium subnigrum Lutz, 1910 i c g
 Simulium subornatoides Rubtsov, 1947 c g
 Simulium subpallidum Lutz, 1910 i c g
 Simulium subpalmatum Davies & Gyorkos, 1992 c g
 Simulium subparadisium Craig, 2006 c g
 Simulium subpusillum Rubtsov, 1940 c g
 Simulium subratai  g
 Simulium subtile Rubtsov, 1956 c g
 Simulium subvariegatum Rubtsov, 1940 c g
 Simulium suchariti Takaoka & Choochote, 2004 c g
 Simulium sulawesiense Takaoka & Roberts, 1988 c g
 Simulium sumapazense Coscaron & Py-Daniel, 1989 c g
 Simulium sumatraense Takaoka & Sigit, 1997 c g
 Simulium sundaicum Edwards, 1934 c g
 Simulium supercilium Craig, 2006 c g
 Simulium suplidoi Takaoka, 1983 c g
 Simulium surachaii Takaoka & Choochote, 2005 c g
 Simulium sutebense Takaoka, 2003 c g
 Simulium sutheppuiense Takaoka, Srisuka & Saeung, 2020 g
 Simulium suzukii Rubtsov, 1963 c g
 Simulium syafruddini Takaoka, 2003 c g
 Simulium synanceium Chen & Cao, 1983 c g
 Simulium syriacum Roubaud, 1909 c g
 Simulium sytshevskiae (Rubtsov, 1967) c g
 Simulium syuhaiense Huang & Takaoka, 2008 g

T

 Simulium taalense Takaoka, 1983 c g
 Simulium tachengense An & Maha, 1994 c g
 Simulium tafae Smart & Clifford, 1965 c g
 Simulium tafulaense Takaoka, 2003 c g
 Simulium tahitiense Edwards, 1927 c g
 Simulium taichungense Takaoka & Huang, 2018 g
 Simulium taipei (Shiraki, 1935) c g
 Simulium taipokauense Takaoka, Davies & Dudgeon, 1995 c g
 Simulium taishanense Sun & Li, 2000 c g
 Simulium taitungense Huang & Takaoka, 2011 g
 Simulium taiwanicum Takaoka, 1979 c g
 Simulium takae Takaoka, 2003 c g
 Simulium takahasii (Rubtsov, 1962) c g
 Simulium takaokai Anbalagan g
 Simulium takense Takaoka & Choochote, 2005 c g
 Simulium talassicum (Yankovsky, 1984) c g
 Simulium tallaferroae Perez, 1971 i c g
 Simulium tamdaoense Takaoka & Sofian-Azirun g
 Simulium tanae Xue, 1992 c g
 Simulium tanahrataense Takaoka & Sofian-Azirun g
 Simulium tandrokum Pilaka & Elouard, 1999 c g
 Simulium tanetchowi Yankovsky, 1996 c g
 Simulium tani Takaoka & Davies, 1995 g
 Simulium tarbagataicum (Rubtsov, 1967) c g
 Simulium tarnogradskii Rubtsov, 1940 c g
 Simulium tarsale Williston, 1896 i c g
 Simulium tarsatum Macquart, 1847 i c g
 Simulium tashikulganense Mahe, Ma & An, 2003 c g
 Simulium tatianae (Bodrova, 1981) c g
 Simulium taulingense Takaoka, 1979 c g
 Simulium tauricum (Rubtsov, 1956) c g
 Simulium taxodium Snoddy and Beshear, 1968 i c g
 Simulium taylori Gibbins, 1938 c g
 Simulium taythienense Takaoka & Sofian-Azirun g
 Simulium teerachanense Takaoka, Srisuka & Fukuda, 2020 g
 Simulium tekamense Takaoka & Sofian-Azirun g
 Simulium temascalense Najera & Vulcano, 1962 c g
 Simulium tenebrosum Takaoka, Srisuka & Saeung, 2018 g
 Simulium tenerificum Crosskey, 1988 c g
 Simulium tentaculum Gibbins, 1936 c g
 Simulium tenuatum Chen, 2000 c g
 Simulium tenuipes Knab, 1914 c g
 Simulium tenuistylum Datta, 1973 c g
 Simulium tenuitarsus (Rubtsov, 1969) c g
 Simulium tergospinosum Hamada, 2000 c g
 Simulium teruamanga Craig & Craig, 1987 c g
 Simulium tescorum Stone and Boreham, 1965 i c g
 Simulium thailandicum Takaoka & Suzuki, 1984 c g
 Simulium thienemanni Edwards, 1934 c g
 Simulium thituyenae Takaoka & Pham, 2015 g
 Simulium thuathienense Takaoka & Sofian-Azirun, 2015 g
 Simulium thungchangense Takaoka, Srisuka & Saeung, 2020 g
 Simulium thyolense Vajime, Tambala, Kruger & Post, 2000 c g
 Simulium tianchi Chen, Zhang & Yang, 2003 c g
 Simulium timondavidi Giudicelli, 1961 c g
 Simulium timorense Takaoka, 2006 c g
 Simulium timpohonense Takaoka & Sofian-Azirun g
 Simulium tjanschanicum Rubtsov, 1963 c g
 Simulium tjidodense Edwards, 1934 c g
 Simulium tobetsuense Ono, 1977 c g
 Simulium tokachiense Takaoka, 2006 c g
 Simulium tokarense Takaoka, 1973 c g
 Simulium tolimaense Coscaron, 1985 c g
 Simulium tolongoinae Grenier & Brunhes, 1972 c g
 Simulium tomae Takaoka, 2003 c g
 Simulium tomentosum Delfinado, 1969 c g
 Simulium tomohonense Takaoka, 2003 c g
 Simulium tondewandouense Fain & Elsen, 1973 c g
 Simulium tongbaishanense Chen, 2006 c g
 Simulium torautense Takaoka & Roberts, 1988 c g
 Simulium tormentor Adler, Currie & Wood, 2004 c g
 Simulium torresianum Mackerras & Mackerras, 1955 c g
 Simulium tosariense Edwards, 1934 c g
 Simulium toubkal Bouzidi & Giudicelli, 1986 c g
 Simulium touffeum Gibbins, 1937 c g
 Simulium townsendi Malloch, 1912 i c g
 Simulium trangense  g
 Simulium transbaikalicum Rubtsov, 1940 c g
 Simulium transcaspicum Enderlein, 1921 c g
 Simulium transiens Rubtzov, 1940 i c g
 Simulium travassosi D'andretta and D'andretta, 1947 i c g
 Simulium travisi Vargas, Vargas & Ramirez-Perez, 1993 c g
 Simulium triangustum An, Guo & Xu, 1995 c g
 Simulium tricorne Leon, 1945 c g
 Simulium tricrenum (Rubtsov & Carlsson, 1965) c g
 Simulium tridens Freeman & Meillon, 1953 c g
 Simulium trifasciatum Curtis, 1839 c g
 Simulium triglobus Takaoka & Kuvangkadilok, 1999 c g
 Simulium trilineatum (Rubtsov, 1956) c g
 Simulium trirugosum Davies & Gyorkos, 1988 c g
 Simulium trisphaerae Wanson & Henrard, 1944 c g
 Simulium trivittatum Malloch, 1914 i c g
 Simulium trombetense Hamada, Py-Daniel & Adler, 1998 c g
 Simulium trukense Stone, 1964 c g
 Simulium truncata (Lundstrom, 1911) i
 Simulium truncatum (Lundstrom, 1911) c g
 Simulium tsharae (Yankovsky, 1982) c g
 Simulium tsheburovae (Rubtsov, 1956) c g
 Simulium tshernovskii (Rubtsov, 1956) c g
 Simulium tshuni Yankovsky, 2006 c g
 Simulium tuberculum Craig, 2006 c g
 Simulium tuberosum (Lundstrom, 1911) i c g b  (Twinn's black fly)
 Simulium tuenense Takaoka, 1979 c g
 Simulium tukorongense Takaoka & Tenedero, 2019 g
 Simulium tumidum Takaoka, 2003 c g
 Simulium tumninum Bodrova, 1989 c g
 Simulium tumpaense Takaoka & Roberts, 1988 c g
 Simulium tumulosum Rubtsov, 1956 c g
 Simulium tumum Chen & Zhang, 2001 c g
 Simulium tunja Coscaron, 1991 c g
 Simulium turgaicum Rubtsov, 1940 c g
 Simulium tuyense Takaoka, 1983 c g

U-V

 Simulium uaense Sechan, 1983 c g
 Simulium ubiquitum Adler, Currie & Wood, 2004 c g
 Simulium uchidai (Takahasi, 1950) c g
 Simulium udomi Takaoka & Choochote, 2006 c g
 Simulium uemotoi Sato, Takaoka & Fukuda, 2004 c g
 Simulium ufengense Takaoka, 1979 c g
 Simulium ulyssesi Py-Daniel & Coscaron, 2001 c g
 Simulium umphangense Takaoka, Srisuka & Saeung, 2017 g
 Simulium uncum Zhang & Chen, 2001 c g
 Simulium undecimum Takaoka, Srisuka & Saeung, 2018 g
 Simulium underhilli Stone and Snoddy, 1969 i c g
 Simulium undulatum Craig, 2006 c g
 Simulium unicornutum Pomeroy, 1920 c g
 Simulium unii Takaoka & Pham g
 Simulium unum Datta, 1975 c g
 Simulium upikae Takaoka & Davies, 1996 c g
 Simulium urbanum Davies, 1966 c g
 Simulium urubambanum Enderlein, 1933 i c g
 Simulium urundiense Fain, 1950 c g
 Simulium usovae (Golini, 1987) c
 Simulium ussovae Bodrova, 1989 c g
 Simulium vampirum Adler, Currie & Wood, 2004 c g
 Simulium vamprium Adler, Currie & Wood, 2004 c g
 Simulium vangilsi Wanson, 1947 c g
 Simulium vanluni Ya'cob, Takaoka & Sofian-Azirun, 2017 g
 Simulium vantshi (Petrova, 1983) c g
 Simulium vantshum Chubareva, 2000 c g
 Simulium varians Lutz, 1909 i c g
 Simulium varicorne Edwards, 1925 c g
 Simulium variegatum (Meigen, 1818) c g
 Simulium veltistshevi Rubtsov, 1940 c g
 Simulium velutinum (Santos Abreu, 1922) c g
 Simulium venator Dyar and Shannon, 1927 i c g
 Simulium venezuelense Perez & Peterson, 1981 c g
 Simulium venustum Say, 1823 i c g
 Simulium veracruzanum Vargas, Palacios & Najera, 1946 c g
 Simulium verecundum Stone and Jamnback, 1955 i c g
 Simulium vernum (Macquart, 1826) i c g
 Simulium vershininae Yankovsky, 1979 c g
 Simulium versicolor Lutz and Tovar, 1928 i c g
 Simulium vidanoi (Rubtsov, 1964) c g
 Simulium vietnamense Takaoka, Sofian-Azirun & Chen, 2014 g
 Simulium vigintifile (Dinulescu, 1966) c g
 Simulium vilhenai Luna de Carvalho, 1962 c g
 Simulium violacescens Enderlein, 1933 i c g
 Simulium violator Adler, Currie & Wood, 2004 c g
 Simulium violovitshi (Rubtsov, 1962) c g
 Simulium virgatum Coquillett, 1902 i c g
 Simulium visayaense Takaoka, 1983 c g
 Simulium vischarvi Chubareva, 1996 c g
 Simulium visuti Takaoka & Choochote, 2006 c g
 Simulium vitile (Rubtsov, 1955) c g
 Simulium vittatum (Zetterstedt, 1838) i c g
 Simulium voilense Sherban, 1960 c g
 Simulium volhynicum (Usova & Sukhomlin, 1990) g
 Simulium voltae Grenier & Ovazza, 1960 c g
 Simulium vorax Pomeroy, 1922 c g
 Simulium vulcanoae Diaz Najera, 1969 c g
 Simulium vulgare Dorogostaisky & Rubtsov, 1935 c g

W-Z

 Simulium wakrisense Takaoka, 2003 c g
 Simulium walterwittmeri Wygodzinsky, 1958 c g
 Simulium wambanum Elsen, Fain & de Boeck, 1983 c g
 Simulium wamenae Smart & Clifford, 1965 c g
 Simulium wanchaii Takaoka, 2006 c g
 Simulium wangxianense Chen, Zhang & Bi, 2004 c g
 Simulium wantoatense Smart & Clifford, 1965 c g
 Simulium watanabei Takaoka, 2003 c g
 Simulium waterfallum Zhang, Yang & Chen, 2003 c g
 Simulium watetoense Takaoka, 2003 c g
 Simulium weiningense Chen & Zhang, 1997 c g
 Simulium weisiense Deng, 2005 c g
 Simulium weji Takaoka, 2001 c g
 Simulium wellmanni Roubaud, 1906 c g
 Simulium weyeri Garms & Hausermann, 1968 c g
 Simulium wilhelmlandae Smart, 1944 c g
 Simulium wirthi Peterson & Craig, 1997 c g
 Simulium wolffhuegeli (Enderlein, 1922) c g
 Simulium woodi Meillon, 1930 c g
 Simulium wuayaraka Ortiz, 1957 i
 Simulium wulaofengense Chen & Zhang g
 Simulium wulindongense An, 2006 c g
 Simulium wutaishanense An & Ge, 2003 c g
 Simulium wuzhishanense Chen, 2003 c g
 Simulium wygodzinskyorum Coscaron & Py-Daniel, 1989 c g
 Simulium wygoi Coscaron, Ibanez-Bernal & Coscaron-Arias, 1999 c g
 Simulium wyomingense (Stone and De Foliart, 1959) i c g
 Simulium xanthinum Edwards, 1933 c g
 Simulium xanthogastrum Rubtsov, 1951 c g
 Simulium xiaodaoense Liu, Shi & An, 2004 c g
 Simulium xiaolongtanense Cheng, Luo & Yang, 2006 c g
 Simulium xinbinense (Chen & Cao, 1983) c g
 Simulium xingyiense Chen & Zhang, 1998 c g
 Simulium xinzhouense Chen & Zhang g
 Simulium xuandai Takaoka & Sofian-Azirun g
 Simulium xuandei Takaoka & Pham, 2015 g
 Simulium yacuchuspi Wygodzinsky and Coscaron, 1967 i c g
 Simulium yadongense Deng & Chen, 1993 c g
 Simulium yaeyamaense Takaoka, 1991 c g
 Simulium yahense Vajime & Dunbar, 1975 c g
 Simulium yamayaense Ogata & Sasa, 1954 c g
 Simulium yanaense Anbalagan, Vijayan, Balachandran & Dinakaran, 2019 g
 Simulium yemenense Crosskey & Garms, 1982 c g
 Simulium yepocapense Dalmat, 1949 c g
 Simulium yokotense Shiraki, 1935 c g
 Simulium yonagoense Okamoto, 1958 c g
 Simulium yonakuniense Takaoka, 1972 c g
 Simulium yongi Takaoka & Davies, 1997 c g
 Simulium yuanbaoshanense Chen, Zhang & Zhang, 2007 c g
 Simulium yuleae Takaoka, 1995 c g
 Simulium yunnanense Chen & Zhang, 2004 c g
 Simulium yuntaiense Chen, Wen & Wei, 2006 c g
 Simulium yuphae Takaoka & Choochote, 2005 c g
 Simulium yushangense Takaoka, 1979 c g
 Simulium yvonneae Takaoka & Low, 2018 g
 Simulium zakhariense (Rubtsov, 1955) c g
 Simulium zaporojae Pavlichenko, 1986 c g
 Simulium zempoalense Vargas, Palacios & Najera, 1946 c g
 Simulium zephyrus Adler, Currie & Wood, 2004 c g
 Simulium zetterstedti Carlsson, 1962 c g
 Simulium zhangjiajiense Chen, Zhang & Bi, 2004 c g
 Simulium zhiltzovae (Rubtsov, 1976) c g
 Simulium zinaidae Crosskey, 1997 c g
 Simulium zombaense Freeman & Meillon, 1953 c g
 Simulium zonatum Edwards, 1934 c g

Data sources: i = ITIS, c = Catalogue of Life, g = GBIF, b = Bugguide.net

References

Simulium